= Octoechos =

Byzantine musical system with eight modes

Oktōēchos (here transcribed "Octoechos"; Greek: ὁ Ὀκτώηχος Ancient Greek pronunciation: [okˈtóixos]; from ὀκτώ "eight" and ἦχος "sound, mode" called echos; Slavonic: Осмогласие, Osmoglasie from о́смь "eight" and гласъ, Glagolitic: ⰳⰾⰰⱄⱏ, "voice, sound") is the eight-mode system used for the composition of religious chant in Byzantine, Syriac, Armenian, Georgian, Latin and Slavic churches since the Middle Ages. In a modified form the octoechos is still regarded as the foundation of the tradition of monodic chant in the Byzantine Rite today.

== Nomenclature ==
The names ascribed to the eight tones differ in translations into Church Slavonic. The Slavonic system counted the plagioi echoi as glasa 5, 6, 7, and 8. For reference, these differences are shown here together with the Ancient Greek names of the octave species according to the Hagiopolites (see Hagiopolitan Octoechos) and to the chant treatises and tonaries of Carolingian theorists. Fifteenth-century composers like Manuel Chrysaphes, Lampadarios at the Court of Palaiologan Constantinople exchanged the Phrygian with the Lydian. The Armenian names and their temporal cycles are represented in the article about the hymn books octoechos and parakletike.

Byzantine octoechos	Church Slavonic osmoglasie	Octave species	Carolingian octo toni
First (ἦχος πρῶτος)	First (гласъ а.)	Dorian	Tonus primus / Authentus protus
Second (ἦχος δεύτερος)	Second (гласъ в.)	Phrygian	Tonus tertius / Authentus deuterus
Third (ἦχος τρίτος)	Third (гласъ г.)	Lydian	Tonus quintus / Authentus tritus
Fourth (ἦχος τέταρτος)	Fourth (гласъ д.)	Mixolydian	Tonus septimus / Authentus tetrardus
Plagal of the First (ἦχος πλάγιος τοῦ πρώτου)	Fifth (гласъ є.)	Hypodorian	Tonus secundus / Plagis proti
Plagal of the Second (ἦχος πλάγιος τοῦ δευτέρου)	Sixth (гласъ ѕ.)	Hypophrygian	Tonus quartus / Plagis deuteri
Grave (ἦχος βαρύς)	Seventh (гласъ з.)	Hypolydian	Tonus sextus / Plagis triti
Plagal of the Fourth (ἦχος πλάγιος τοῦ τετάρτου)	Eighth (гласъ и.)	Hypomixolydian	Tonus octavus / Plagis tetrardi

Southern Slavs use the Byzantine musical system and, nonetheless, use the variant numbering that is always found in Church Slavonic texts.

== History ==
According to three main periods, which divides the history of the eight-mode system, the former article has been split chronologically:

Octoechos	Period	Reference
Hagiopolitan Octoechos	6th–13th century	St. John of Damascus
Papadic Octoechos	13th–18th century	John Glykys, John Koukouzeles
Neobyzantine Octoechos	18th–21st century	Chrysanthos of Madytos

== Analysis ==
Byzantine Chant performance practice has been computationally compared to the theory by Chrysanthos. The analysis of 94 Byzantine Chants performed by 4 singers showed a tendency of the singers to level theoretic particularities of the echos that stand out of the general norm in the octoechos. In practice, smaller scale degree steps (67-133 cents) appear to be increased and the highest scale step of 333 cents appears to be decreased compared to theory. In practice, the first four scale notes in decreasing order of prominence I, III, II, IV are more prominent than the V., VI., and the VII.
