= Neobyzantine Octoechos =

Oktōēchos (here transcribed "Octoechos"; Greek: ὁ Ὀκτώηχος Ancient Greek pronunciation: [okˈtóixos]; from ὀκτώ "eight" and ἦχος "sound, mode" called echos; Slavonic: Осмогласие, Osmoglasie from о́смь "eight" and гласъ "voice, sound") is the name of the eight mode system used for the composition of religious chant in Byzantine, Syriac, Armenian, Georgian, Latin and Slavic churches since the Middle Ages. In a modified form the octoechos is still regarded as the foundation of the tradition of monodic Orthodox chant today.

From a Phanariot point of view, the re-formulation of the Octoechos and its melodic models according to the New Method was neither a simplification of the Byzantine tradition nor an adaption to Western tonality and its method of an heptaphonic solfeggio, just based on one tone system (σύστημα κατὰ ἑπταφωνίαν). Quite the opposite, as a universal approach to music traditions of the Mediterranean it was rather based on the integrative power of the psaltic art and the Papadike, which can be traced back to the Hagiopolitan Octoechos and its exchange with Oriental music traditions for more than a thousand years.

Hence, the current article is divided into three parts. The first is a discussion of the current solfeggio method based on seven syllables in combination with the invention of a universal notation system which transcribed the melos in the very detail (Chrysanthos' Theoretikon mega). The second and third part are based on a theoretical separation between the exoteric and the esoteric use of modern or Neobyzantine notation. Exoteric (ἐξωτερική = "External") music meaning the transcription of patriotic songs, opera arias, and traditional music of the Mediterranean including Ottoman makam and Persian music, while esoteric (ἐσωτερική = "internal") points at the papadic tradition of using Round notation with the modal signatures of the eight modes, now interpreted as a simple pitch key without implying any cadential patterns of certain echos. In practice, there had never been such a rigid separation between exoteric and esoteric among Romaic musicians, certain exchanges—with makam traditions in particular—were rather essential for the redefinition of Byzantine Chant, at least according to the traditional chant books published as "internal music" by the teachers of the New Music School of the Patriarchate.

== Transcribing theseis of the melos and makam music ==
Unlike Western tonality and music theory, the universal theory of the Phanariotes does not distinguish between major and minor scales, even if they transcribed Western polyphony into Byzantine neumes. In fact, the majority of the models of the Byzantine Octoechos, as they are performed in Mediterranean churches by traditional singers, would lose their proper intonation and expression if they were played on a conventionally tuned piano. Exactly the familiarity with microtonal intervals was an advantage, which made the Chrysanthine or Neobyzantine notation as a medium of transmission more universal than any Western notation system. Among others, even Western staff notation and Eastern neume notation had been used for transcriptions of Ottoman classical music, despite their specific traditional background.

The transcription into the reform notation and its distribution by the first printed chant books were another aspect of the Phanariotes' universality. The first source to study the development of modern Byzantine notation and its translation of Papadic Notation is Chrysanthos' "Long Treatise of Music Theory." In 1821, only a small extract had been published as a manual for his reform notation, the Θεωρητικόν μέγα was printed later in 1832. Like the Papadic method, Chrysanthos described first the basic elements, the phthongoi, their intervals according to the genus, and how to memorise them by a certain solfeggio called "parallage." The thesis of the melos was part of the singers' performance and it also included the use of rhythm.

=== Chrysanthos' parallagai of the three genera (γένη) ===
In the early Hagiopolitan Octoechos (6th-13th century) the diatonic echoi were destroyed by two phthorai nenano and nana, which were like two additional modes with their own melos, but subordinated to certain diatonic echoi. In the period of psaltic art (13th-17th century), changes between the diatonic, the chromatic, and the enharmonic genus became so popular in certain chant genres, that certain diatonic echoi of the Papadic Octoechos were coloured by the phthorai—not only by the traditional Hagiopolitan phthorai, but also by additional phthorai, which introduced transition models assimilated to certain makam intervals. After Chrysanthos' redefinition of Byzantine chant according to the New Method (1814), the scales of echos protos and of echos tetartos used intervals according to soft diatonic tetrachord divisions, while those of the tritos echoi and of the papadic echos plagios tetartos had become enharmonic (φθορά νανά) and those of the devteros echoi chromatic (φθορά νενανῶ).

In his Mega Theoretikon (vol. 1, book 3), Chrysanthos did not only discuss the difference to European concepts of the diatonic genus, but also the other genera (chromatic and enharmonic), which had been refused in the treatises of Western music theory. He included Papadic forms of parallagai, as they had been described in the article Papadic Octoechos, Western solfeggio, as well as another solfeggio taken from Ancient Greek harmonics. The differences between the diatonic, the chromatic, and enharmonic genus (gr. γένος) were defined by the use of microtones—more precisely by the question of whether intervals were narrower or wider than the proportion of the Latin "semitonium," once defined by Eratosthenes. His points of reference were the equally tempered, the just intonation, as it had been used since the Renaissance period, and the Pythagorean intonation, as it has been used in the diatonic genus of the Carolingian Octoechos since the Middle Ages.

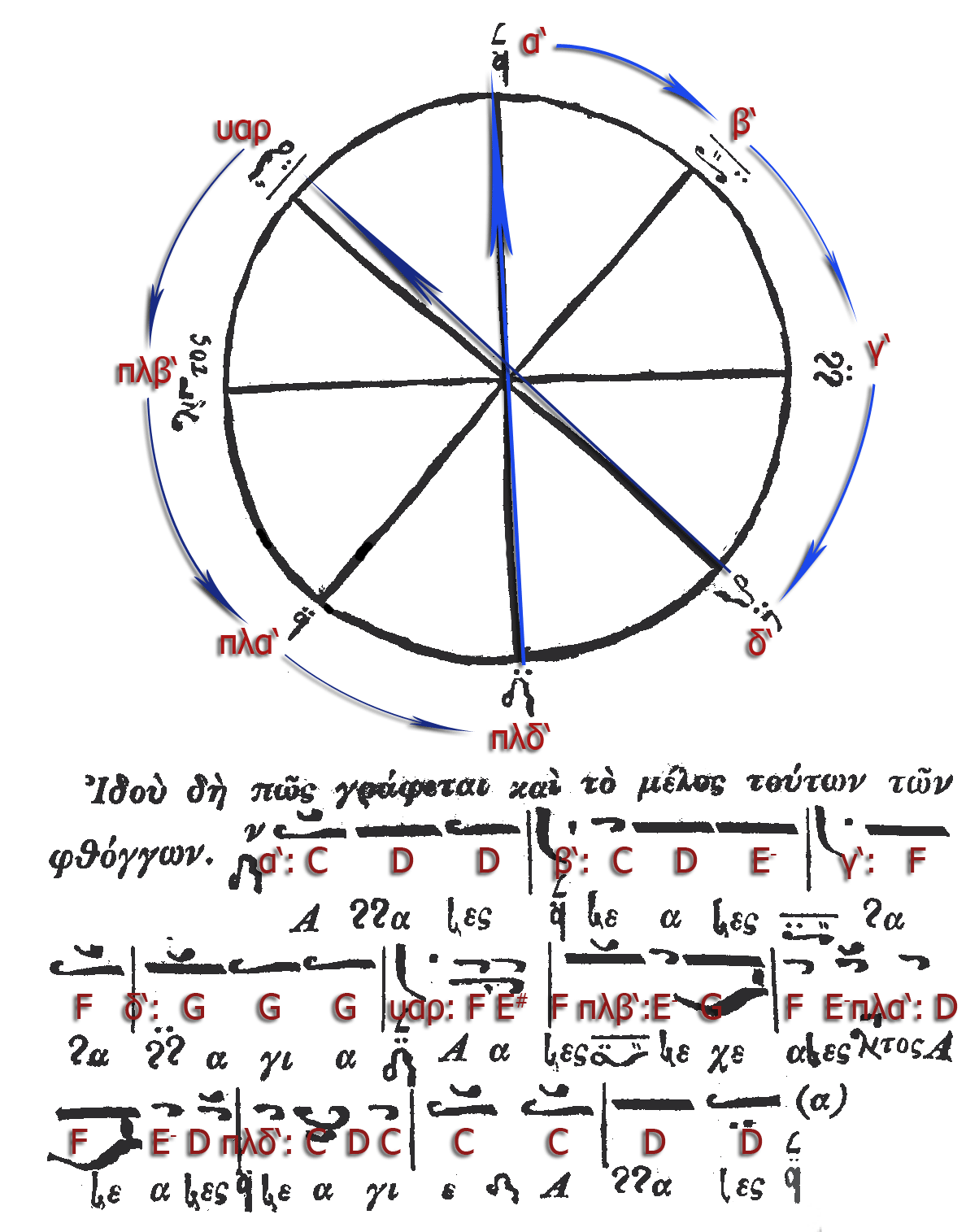
Chrysanthos' Parallage according to the trochos system (1832, p. 30)

==== Parallage of the diatonic genus ====
Chrysanthos had already introduced his readers to the diatonic genus and its phthongoi in the 5th chapter of the first book, called "About the parallage of the diatonic genus" (Περὶ Παραλλαγῆς τοῦ Διατονικοῦ Γένους). In the 8th chapter, he demonstrates how the intervals can be found on the keyboard of the tambur.

Hence, the phthongoi of the diatonic genus had been defined according to the proportions, as they were later called the "soft chroa of the diatonic genus" (τὸ γένος μαλακὸν διατονικὸν). For Chrysanthos, this was the only diatonic genus, as far as it had been used since the early church musicians, who memorised the phthongoi by the intonation formulas (enechemata) of the Papadic Octoechos. In fact, he did not use the historical intonations, he rather translated them in the Koukouzelian wheel in the 9th chapter (Περὶ τοῦ Τροχοῦ) according to a current practice of parallage, which was common to 18th-century versions of Papadike, while he identified another chroa of the diatonic genus with a practice of ancient Greeks:

Τὸ δὲ Πεντάχορδον, τὸ ὁποῖον λέγεται καὶ Τροχὸς, περιέχει διαστήματα τέσσαρα, τὰ ὁποῖα καθ᾽ ἡμᾶς μὲν εἶναι τόνοι· κατὰ δὲ τοὺς ἀρχαίους ἕλληνας, τὰ μὲν τρία ἦσαν τόνοι· καὶ τὸ ἕν λεῖμμα. Περιορίζονται δὲ τὰ τέσσαρα διαστήματα ταῦτα ἀπὸ φθόγγους πέντε.

πα βου γα δι Πα, καθ᾽ ἡμᾶς·

κατὰ δὲ τοὺς ἀρχαίους τε τα τη τω Τε.

The pentachord, which was also called wheel (τροχὸς), contains four intervals which we regard as certain tones [ἐλάσσων τόνος, ἐλάχιστος τόνος, and 2 μείζονες τόνοι], but according to the ancient Greeks they had been three whole tones [3 μείζονες τόνοι] and the difference leimma [256:243]. The four intervals spanned five phthongoi:

πα βου γα δι Πα ["Πα" means here the fifth-equivalent for the protos: α'] for us, but according to the ancient (Greeks) τε τα τη τω Τε.

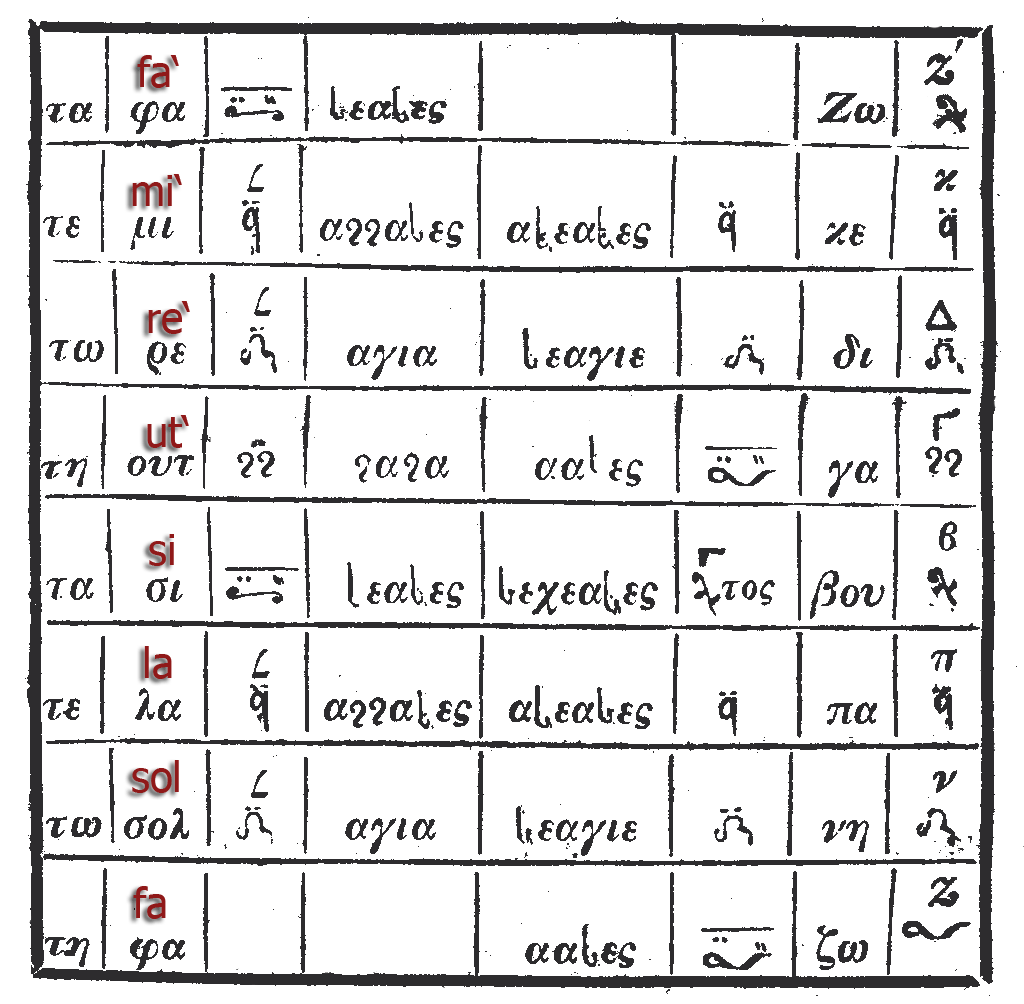
Chrysanthos' Kanonion with a comparison between Ancient Greek tetraphonia (column 1), Western Solfeggio, the Papadic Parallage (ascending: column 3 and 4; descending: column 5 and 6) according to the trochos system, and his heptaphonic parallage according to the New Method (syllables in the fore-last and martyriai in the last column) (1832, p. 33)

In Chrysanthos' version of the wheel, the Middle Byzantine modal signatures had been replaced by alternative signatures which were still recognised by enechemata of the former parallage, and these signatures were important because they formed a part of the modal signatures (martyriai) used in Chrysanthos reform notation. These signs had to be understood as dynameis within the context of the pentachord and the principle of tetraphonia. According to Chrysanthos' signatures (see his kanonion), the phthongoi of plagios protos and plagios tetartos were represented by the modal signature of their kyrioi, but without the final ascending step to the upper fifth, the tritos signature was replaced by the signature of phthora nana, while the signature of plagios devteros (which was no longer used in its diatonic form) had been replaced by the enechema of the mesos tetartos, the so-called "echos legetos" (ἦχος λέγετος) or former ἅγια νεανὲς, according to the New Method the heirmologic melos of the echos tetartos.

In the table at the end of the trochos chapter, it becomes evident, that Chrysanthos was quite aware of the discrepancies between his adaption to the Ottoman tambur frets which he called diapason (σύστημα κατὰ ἑπταφωνίαν), and the former Papadic parallage according to the trochos system (σύστημα κατὰ τετραφωνίαν), which was still recognised as the older practice. And later in the fifth book, he emphasised that the great harmony of Greek music comes by the use of four tone systems (diphonia, triphonia, tetraphonia, and heptaphonia), while European and Ottoman musicians used only the heptaphonia or diapason system:

Ἀπὸ αὐτὰς λοιπὸν ἡ μὲν διαπασῶν εἶναι ἡ ἐντελεστέρα, καὶ εἰς τὰς ἀκοὰς εὐαρεστοτέρα· διὰ τοῦτο καὶ τὸ Διαπασῶν σύστημα προτιμᾶται, καὶ μόνον εἶναι εἰς χρῆσιν παρὰ τοῖς Μουσικοῖς Εὐρωπαίοις τε καὶ Ὀθωμανοῖς· οἵ τινες κατὰ τοῦτο μόνον τονίζοθσι τὰ Μουσικά τῶν ὄργανα.

But among those, the diapason is the most perfect and it pleases the ears more than the others, hence, the diapason system is favored and the only one used by European and Ottoman musicians, so that they tune their instruments only according to this system.

Until the generation of traditional protopsaltes who died during the 1980s, there were still traditional singers who intoned the Octoechos according to the trochos system (columns 3–6), but they did not intone the devteroi phthongoi according to Pythagorean tuning, as Chrysanthos imagined it as a practice of the Ancient Greeks and identified it as a common European practice (first column in comparison with Western solfeggio in the second column).

In the last column of his table, he listed the new modal signatures or matyriai of the phthongoi (μαρτυρίαι "witnesses"), as he introduced them for the use of his reform notation as a kind of pitch class system. These marytyriai had been composed by a thetic and a dynamic sign. The thetic was the first letter of Chrysanthos monosyllable parallage, and the dynamic was taken from 5 signs of the eight enechemata of the trochos: the four of the descending enechemata (πλ α', πλ β', υαρ, and πλ δ'), and the phthora nana (γ'). Thus, it was still possible to refer to the tetraphonia of the trochos system within the heptaphonia of Chrysanthos' parallage, but there was one exception; usually, the νανὰ represented the tritos element, while the varys-sign (the ligature for υαρ) represented the ζω (b natural)—the plagios tritos which could no longer establish a pentachord to its kyrios (like in the old system represented by Western solfeggio between B fa and F ut'), because it had been diminished to a slightly augmented tritone.

The older polysyllable parallage of the trochos was represented between the third and the sixth column. The third column used the "old" modal signatures for the ascending kyrioi echoi according to Chrysanthos' annotation of the trochos, as they became the main signatures of the reform notation. The fourth column listed the names of their enechemata, the fifth column the names of the enechemata of the descending plagioi echoi together with their signatures in the sixth column.

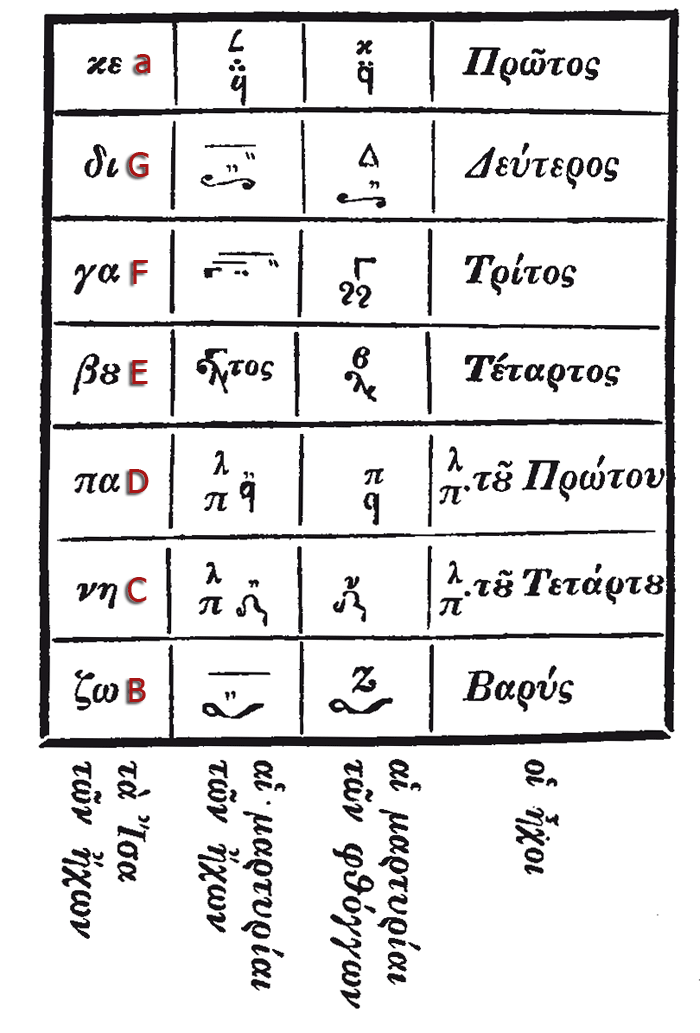
The "martyriai of the echoi" (column 2 & 4: main signatures) and the "martyriai of the phthongoi" (column 3: medial signatures) in the disposition of the "Diapason system" represent no longer the diapente between kyrios and plagios in the diatonic trochos system (Chrysanthos 1832, p. 168)

In the 5th chapter "about the parallage of the diatonic genus", he characterised both parallagai, of the Papadike and of the New Method, as follows:

§. 43. Παραλλαγὴ εἶναι, τὸ νὰ ἑφαρμόζωμεν τὰς συλλαβὰς τῶν φθόγγων ἐπάνω εἰς τοὺς ἐγκεχαραγμένους χαρακτῆρας, ὥστε βλέποντες τοὺς συντεθειμένους χαρακτῆρας, νὰ ψάλλωμεν τοὺς φθόγγους· ἔνθα ὅσον οἱ πολυσύλλαβοι φθόγγοι ἀπομακρύνονται τοῦ μέλους, ἄλλο τόσον οἱ μονοσύλλαβοι ἐγγίζουσιν ἀυτοῦ. Διότι ὅταν μάθῃ τινὰς νὰ προφέρῃ παραλλακτικῶς τὸ μουσικὸν πόνημα ὀρθῶς, ἀρκεῖ ἠ ἀλλάξῃ τὰς συλλαβὰς τῶν φθόγγων, λέγων τὰς συλλαβὰς τῶν λέξεων, καὶ ψάλλει αὐτὸ κατὰ μέλος.

Parallage is to apply the syllables of the phthongoi according to the steps indicated by the phonic neumes, so that we sing the phthongoi while we look at the written neumes. Note that the more the polysyllabic phthongoi lead away from the melos (because the thesis of the melos has still to be done), the more the monosyllable phthongoi go with the melos. Once a musical composition has been studied thoroughly by the use of parallage, it is enough to replace the syllables of the phthongoi by those of the text, and thus, we sing already its melos.

The disadvantage of the Papadic or "polysyllabic parallage" was, that metrophonia (its application to the phonic neumes of a musical composition) led away from the melodic structure, because of the gesture of each modal intonation (enechema), which already represents an echos and its models in itself. After the phonic neumes had been recognised by μετροφωνία, the appropriate method to do the thesis of the melos had to be chosen, before a reader could find the way to the composition's performance. This was no longer necessary with monosyllabic solfeggio or parallage, because the thesis of the melos had been already transcribed into phonic neumes—the musician had finally become as ignorant as Manuel Chrysaphes had already feared during the 15th century.

Nevertheless, the diapason system (see table) had also changed the former tetraphonic disposition of the echoi according to the trochos system, which organised the final notes of each kyrios-plagios pair in a pentachord which had always been a pure fifth. In this heptaphonic disposition, the plagios devteros is not represented, because it would occupy the phthongos of the plagios protos πα, but with a chromatic parallage (see below). The kyrios devteros (δι) and tetartos (βου) have both moved to their mesos position.

The difference between the diapason and the trochos system corresponded somehow with the oral melos transmission of the 18th century, documented by the manuscripts and the printed editions of the "New Music School of the Patriarchate", and the written transmission of the 14th-century chant manuscripts (revised heirmologia, sticheraria, Akolouthiai, and Kontakaria) which fit rather to the Octoechos disposition of the trochos system. Chrysanthos' theory aimed to bridge these discrepancies and the "exegetic transcription" or translation of late Byzantine notation into his notation system. This way the "exegesis" had become an important tool to justify the innovations of the 18th century within the background of the Papadic tradition of psaltic art.

G δι was still the phthongos for the finalis and basis of the papadic echos tetartos, the ἅγια παπαδικῆς, but E βου had become the finalis of the sticheraric, troparic, and heirmologic melos of the same echos, and only the sticheraric melos had a second basis and intonation on the phthongos D πα.

==== Parallagai of the chromatic genus ====
The phthora nenano and the tendency in psaltic art to chromatize compositions since the 14th century had gradually substituted the diatonic models of the devteros echos. In psaltic treatises, the process is described as the career of phthora nenano as an "echos kratema" (κράτημα) which finally turned whole compositions of echos devteros (ἦχος δεύτερος) and of the echos plagios tou devterou (ἦχος πλάγιος τοῦ δευτέρου) into the chromatic genus and the melos of φθορά νενανῶ.

The two chroai can be described as the "soft chromatic genus", which has developed from the mesos devteros, and the "hard chromatic genus" as the proper phthora nenano which follows the protos parallage and changed its tetrachord from E—a to D—G.

==== The soft chromatic scale of mesos devteros and its diphonic tone system ====
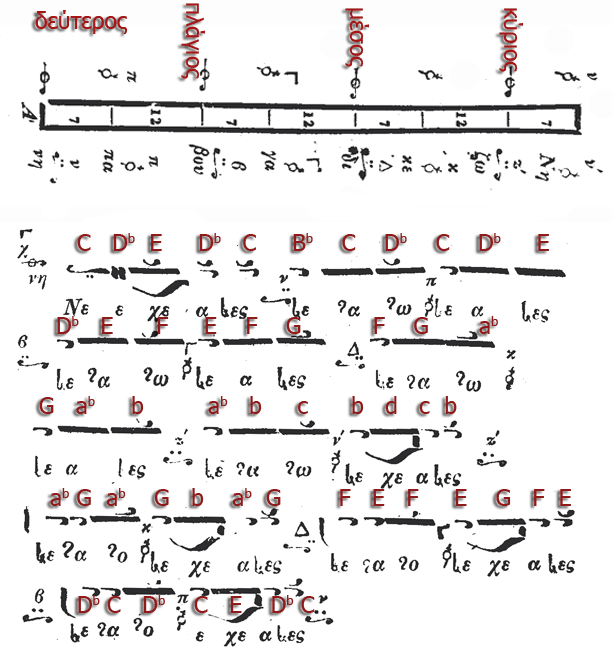
Chrysanthos' parallage of echos devteros in the soft chromatic genus (1832, pp. 106-108)

It found its most odd definition in Chrysanthos' Mega Theoretikon, because he diminished the whole octave about 4 divisions in order to describe echos devteros as a mode which has developed its own diphonic tone system (7+12=19). Indeed, its parallage is indefinite and, in this particular case, the phthora nenano has no direction, instead the direction is defined by the diatonic intonations of echos devteros:

§. 244. Ἡ χρωματικὴ κλίμαξ νη [πα ὕφεσις] βου γα δι [κε ὕφεσις] ζω Νη σχηματίζει ὄχι τετράχορδα, ἀλλὰ τρίχορδα πάντῃ ὅμοια καὶ συνημμένα τοῦτον τὸν τρόπον·

νη [πα ὕφεσις] βου, βου γα δι, δι [κε ὕφεσις] ζω, ζω νη Πα.

Αὕτη ἡ κλίμαξ ἀρχομένη ἀπὸ τοῦ δι, εἰμὲν πρόεισιν ἐπὶ τὸ βαρὺ, θέλει τὸ μὲν δι γα διάστημα τόνον μείζονα· τὸ δὲ γα βου τόνον ἐλάχιστον· τὸ δὲ βου πα, τόνον μείζονα· καὶ τὸ πα νη, τόνον ἐλάχιστον. Εἰδὲ πρόεισιν ἐπὶ τὸ ὀξὺ, θέλει τὸ μὲν δι κε διάστημα τόνον ἐλάχιστον· τὸ δὲ κε ζω, τόνον μείζονα· τὸ δὲ ζω νη, τόνον ἐλάχιστον· καὶ τὸ νη Πα, τόνον μείζονα. Ὥστε ταύτης τῆς χρωματικῆς κλίμακος μόνον οἱ βου γα δι φθόγγοι ταὐτίζονται μὲ τοὺς βου γα δι φθόγγους τῆς διατονικῆς κλίμακος· οἱ δὲ λοιποὶ κινοῦνται. Διότι τὸ βου νη διάστημα κατὰ ταύτην μὲν τὴν κλίμακα περιέχει τόνους μείζονα καὶ ἐλάχιστον· κατὰ δὲ τὴν διατονικὴν κλίμακα περιέχει τόνους ἐλάσσονα καὶ μείζονα· ὁμοίως καὶ τὸ δι ζω διάστημα.

The chromatic scale C νη—[D flat]—E βου—F γα—G δι—[a flat]—b ζω'—c νη' is not made of tetrachords, but of trichords which are absolutely equal and conjunct with each other—in this way:

C νη—[D flat]—E βου, E βου—F γα—G δι, G δι—[a flat]—b ζω', b ζω'—c νη'—d πα'

If the scale starts on G δι, and it moves towards the lower, the step G δι—F γα requests the interval of a great tone (μείζων τόνος) and the step F γα—E βου a small tone (ἐλάχιστος τόνος); likewise the step E βου—[D flat] πα [ὕφεσις] an interval of μείζων τόνος, and the step πα [ὕφεσις] [D flat]—C νη one of ἐλάχιστος τόνος. When the direction is towards the higher, the step G δι—[a flat] κε [ὕφεσις] requests the interval of a small tone and [a flat] κε [ὕφεσις]—b ζω' that of a great tone; likewise the step b ζω'—c νη' an interval of ἐλάχιστος τόνος, and the step c νη'—Cd πα one of μείζων τόνος. Among the phthongoi of this chromatic scale only the phthongoi βου, γα, and δι can be identified with the same phthongoi of the diatonic scale, while the others are moveable degrees of the mode. While this scale extends between E βου and C νη over one great and one small tone [12+7=19], the diatonic scale extends from the middle (ἐλάσσων τόνος) to the great tone (μείζων τόνος) [12+9=21], for the interval between G δι and b ζω' it is the same.

In this chromatic genus there is a strong resemblance between the phthongos G δι, the mesos devteros, and b ζω', the kyrios devteros, but as well to E βου or to C νη. The trichordal structure (σύστημα κατὰ διφωνίαν) is nevertheless memorised with a soft chromatic nenano intonation around the small tone and the enechema of ἦχος δεύτερος in the ascending parallage and the enechema of ἦχος λέγετος as ἦχος πλάγιος τοῦ δευτέρου in the descending parallage.

According to Chrysanthos, the old enechema for the diatonic echos devteros on b ζω' was preserved by traditional singers as the chromatic mesos, which he transcribed by the following exegesis. Please note the soft chromatic phthora at the beginning:

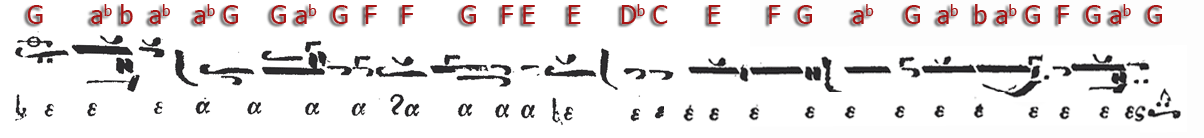
Exegesis of the traditional echos devteros intonation as chromatic mesos (Chrysanthos 1832, pp. 137–138, § 310)

It can be argued that Chrysanthos' concept of the devteros phthora was not chromatic at all, but later manuals replaced his concept of diatonic diphonia by a concept of chromatic tetraphonia similar to the plagios devteros, and added the missing two divisions to each pentachord, so that the octave of this echos C νη—G δι—c νη' was in tune (C νη—G δι, G δι—d πα': |7 + 14 + 7| + 12 = 40). Also this example explains an important aspect of the contemporary concept of exegesis.

==== The hard chromatic and mixed scale of plagios devteros ====
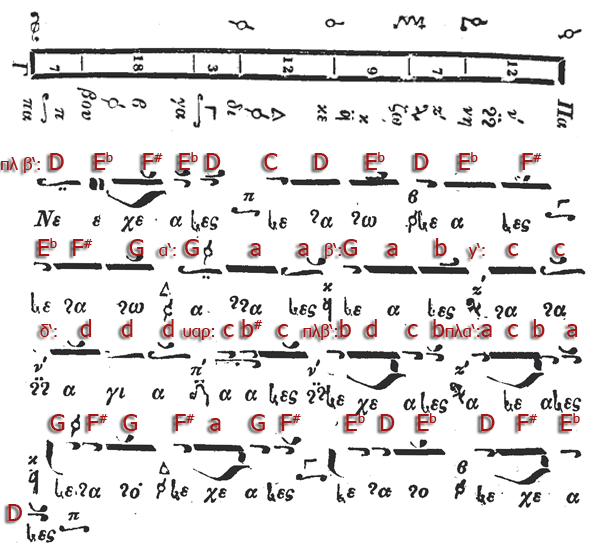
Chrysanthos' parallage of echos plagios devteros in one of the mixed genera, the lower tetrachord divided by the phthora nenano and the upper tetrachord according to the diatonic genus (1832, pp. 107, 109)

If we remember that the φθορά νενανῶ originally appeared between βου (πλ β'), the phthongos of plagios devteros (ἦχος πλάγιος τοῦ δευτέρου), and κε (α'), the phthongos of protos (ἦχος πρῶτος), we are not so surprised, when we read, that the hard chromatic scale uses the same names during its parallage as the parallage of ἦχος δεύτερος:

§. 247. Τὴν δὲ Β κλίμακα πα [βου ὕφεσις] [γα δίεσις] δι κε [ζω ὕφεσις] [νη δίεσις] Πα, μὲ τοὺς αὐτοὺς μὲν φθόγγους ψάλλομεν, καὶ ἡ μελῳδία τοῦτων μὲ τοὺς αὐτοὺς χαρακτῆρας γράφεται· ὅμως οἱ φθόγγοι φυλάττουσι τὰ διαστήματα, ἅτινα διωρίσθησαν (§. 245.).

We sing with the same phthongoi (here the same names for the notes as memorial places), the second [chromatic] scale: D πα—[high E flat]—[high F sharp]—G δι—a κε—[high b flat]—[high c sharp]—d πα', and their melody is written with the same phonic neumes. Nevertheless the phthongoi preserve the intervals as written in § 245. Without any doubt the hard chromatic phthongoi use the chromaticism with the enharmonic hemitone of the intonation νενανῶ, so in this case the chromatic parallage gets a very clear direction, that the diphonic tone system does not have:

§. 245. Ἡ χρωματικὴ κλίμαξ, πα [βου ὕφεσις] [γα δίεσις] δι κε [ζω ὕφεσις] [νη δίεσις] Πα, σύγκειται ἀπὸ δύο τετράχορδα· ἐν ἑκατέρῳ δὲ τετραχόρδῳ κεῖνται τὰ ἡμίτονα οὕτως, ὥστε τὸ διάστημα πα βου εἶναι ἴσον μὲ τὸ κε ζω· τὸ δὲ βου γα εἶναι ἴσον μὲ τὸ ζω νη· καὶ τὸ γα δι εἶναι ἴσον μὲ τὸ νη Πα· καὶ ὅλον τὸ πα δι τετράχορδον εἶναι ἴσον μὲ τὸ κε Πα τετράχορδον. Εἶναι δὲ τὸ μὲν πα βου διάστημα ἴσον ἐλαχιστῳ τόνῳ· τὸ δὲ βου γα, τριημιτόνιον· καὶ τὸ γα δι, ἡμιτόνιον· ἤγουν ἴσον 3:12.

The chromatic scale: D πα—[high E flat]—[high F sharp]—G δι—a κε—[high b flat]—[high c sharp]—d πα', consists of two tetrachords. In each tetrachord the hemitones are placed in a way that the interval D πα—E βου [ὕφεσις] is the same as a κε—b ζω' [ὕφεσις], Ε βου [ὕφεσις]—F sharp γα [δίεσις] is the same as b ζω' [ὕφεσις]—c sharp νη' [δίεσις], and F sharp γα [δίεσις]—G δι is the same as c sharp νη' [δίεσις]—d πα', so that both tetarchords, D πα—G δ and a κε—d πα', are unisono. This means that the interval D πα—E βου [ὕφεσις] is unisono with the small tone (ἐλάχιστος τόνος), Ε βου [ὕφεσις]—F sharp γα [δίεσις] with the trihemitone, and F sharp γα [δίεσις]—G δι with the hemitone: 3:12—a quarter of the great tone (μείζων τόνος) [7+18+3=28].

The shift of phthora nenano from the devteros to the protos parallage was explained by Chrysanthos through the exegesis of the Papadic plagios devteros intonation. Please note the hard chromatic phthorai, the second in the text line had been taken from the papadic phthora nenano:

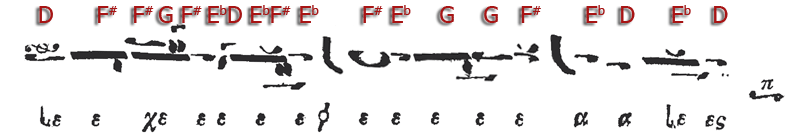
Exegesis of the traditional intonation of the diatonic echos plagios tou devterou (ἦχος πλάγιος τοῦ δευτέρου) in the melos of the phthora nenano (Chrysanthos 1832, p. 139, § 314)

Despite this pure chromatic form, the plagios devteros in the sticheraric and papadic melos is the only echos of the Octoechos which combines as well and in a temporary change of genus (μεταβολή κατὰ γένος) two different genera within the two tetrachords of the protos octave, while the diatonic tetrachord lies between δ' and γ' (a triphonic construction πλα'—δ'—γ'), and has the melos of echos tetartos (as shown in the mixed example of its parallage). As could already studied in the parallage of Ioannis Plousiadinos, the same chromatic tetrachord could be as well that of the protos (πλα'—δ') like in the older enechemata of phthora nenano. The other mixed form, though rare, was the combination of phthora nenano on the protos parallage (α' κε—δ' πα') with a diatonic protos pentachord under it (πλ α' πα—α' κε).

==== Enharmonic genos and triphonia of phthora nana ====
According to the definition of Aristides Quintilianus, quoted in the seventh chapter of the third book (περὶ τοῦ ἐναρμονίου γένους) in Chrysanthos' Mega Theoretikon, "enharmonic" is defined by the smallest interval, as long as it is not larger than a quarter or a third of the great tone (μείζων τόνος):

§. 258. Ἁρμονία δὲ λέγεται εἰς τὴν μουσικὴν τὸ γένος ὅπερ ἔχει εἰς τὴν κλίμακά του διάστημα τεταρτημορίου τοῦ μείζονος τόνου· τὸ δὲ τοιοῦτον διάστημα λέγεται ὕφεσις ἢ δίεσις ἐναρμόνιος· καθὼς καὶ δίεσις χρωματικὴ λέγεται τὸ ἥμισυ διάστημα τοῦ μείζονος τόνου. Ἐπειδὴ δὲ ὁ ἐλάχιστος τόνος, λογιζόμενος ἴσος 7, διαιρούμενος εἰς 3 καὶ 4, δίδει τεταρτημόριον καὶ τριτημόριον τοῦ μείζονος τόνου, ἡμεῖς ὅταν λάβωμεν ἓν διάστημα βου γα, ἴσον 3, εὑρίσκομεν τὴν ἐναρμόνιον δίεσιν· τὴν ὁποίαν μεταχειριζόμενοι εἰς τὴν κλίμακα, ἐκτελοῦμεν τὸ ἐναρμόνιον γένος· διότι χαρακτηρίζεται, λέγει ὁ Ἀριστείδης, τὸ ἐναρμόνιον γένος ἐκ τῶν τεταρτημοριαίων διέσεων τοῦ τόνου.

In music, the genus is called "harmony" which has the interval of a quarter great tone (μείζων τόνος) in its scale, and such an interval is called the "enharmonic" hyphesis or diesis, while the diesis with an interval about half of a great tone is called "chromatic". Since the small tone (ἐλάχιστος τόνος) is considered equal to 7 parts, the difference about 3 or 4, which makes a quarter or a third of the great tone, and the interval E βου—F γα, equal to 3, can be found through the enharmonic diesis; this applied to a scale, realizes the enharmonic genus. Aristeides said that the enharmonic genus was characterised by the diesis about a quarter of a whole tone.

But the difference about 50 cents already made the difference between the small tone (ἐλάχιστος τόνος) and the Western semitonium (88:81=143 C', 256:243=90 C'), so it did not only already appear in the hard chromatic genos, but also in the Eastern use of dieses within the diatonic genus and in the definition of the diatonic genus in Latin chant treatises. Hence, several manuals of Orthodox Chant mentioned that the enharmonic use of intervals had been spread over all different genera (Chrysanthos discussed these differences within the genus as "chroa"), but several Phanariotes defined this general phenomenon by the use of the word "harmony" (ἁρμονία) which was the Greek term for music and contrasted it with the modern term "music" (μουσική) which had been taken from Arabic, usually to make a difference between the reference to ancient Greek music theory and the autochthonous theory treating melody (naġām) and rhythm (īqā′at). According to the ancient Greek use, ἐναρμονίος was simply an adjective meaning "being within the music." In the discussion of the Euklidian term "chroa", he mentioned that the substitution of a semitonium by two dieses as it can be found in Western music, was "improper" (ἄτοπον) in Byzantine as well as in Ottoman art music, because it added one more element to the heptaphonic scale.

But Aristeides' definition also explained, why the enharmonic phthora nana (also called phthora atzem) had been defined in later manuals as "hard diatonic." The more characteristic change was less those of the genus (μεταβολή κατὰ γένος) than the one from the tetraphonic to the triphonic tone system (μεταβολή κατὰ σύστημα):

Διὰ τοῦτο ὅταν τὸ μέλος τοῦ ἐναρμονίου γένους ἄρχηται ἀπὸ τοῦ γα, θέλει νὰ συμφωνῇ μὲ τὸν γα ἡ ζω ὕφεσις, καὶ ὄχι ὁ νη φθόγγος. Καὶ ἐκεῖνο ὅπερ εἰς τὴν διατονικὴν καὶ χρωματικὴν κλίμακα ἐγίνετο διὰ τῆς τετραφωνίας, ἐδῶ γίνεται διὰ τῆς τριφωνίας

νη πα [βου δίεσις] γα, γα δι κε [ζω ὕφεσις−6], [ζω ὕφεσις−6] νη πα [βου ὕφεσις−6].

Ὥστε συγκροτοῦνται καὶ ἐδῶ τετράχορδα συνημμένα ὅμοια, διότι ἔχουσι τὰ ἐν μέσῳ διαστήματα ἴσα· τὸ μὲν νη πα ἴσον τῷ γα δι· τὸ δὲ πα [βου δίεσις], ἴσον τῷ δι κε· τὸ δὲ [βου δίεσις] γα, ἴσον τῷ κε [ζω ὕφεσις−6]· καὶ τὰ λοιπά.

Hence, if the melos of the enharmonic genus starts on F γα, F γα and b flat [ζω' ὕφεσις−6] should be symphonous, and not the phthongos c νη'. And like the diatonic and chromatic scales are made of tetraphonia, here they are made of triphonia:

C νη—D πα—E sharp [βου δίεσις]—F γα, F γα—G δι—a κε—b flat [ζω' ὕφεσις−6], b flat [ζω' ὕφεσις−6]—c νη'—d πα'—e flat [βου' ὕφεσις−6].

Thus, conjunct similar tetrachords are also constructed by the same intervals in the middle [12+13+3=28]: C νη—D πα is equal to F γα—G δι, D πα—E sharp [βου δίεσις] to G δι—a κε, E sharp [βου δίεσις]—F γα is equal to a κε—b flat [ζω' ὕφεσις−6], etc.

As can be already seen in the Papadikai of the 17th century, the diatonic intonation of echos tritos had been represented by the modal signature of the enharmonic phthora nana. In his chapter about the intonation formulas (περὶ ἁπηχημάτων), Chrysanthos no longer refers to the diatonic intonation of ἦχος τρίτος, instead the echos tritos is simply an exegesis of the enharmonic phthora nana. Please note the use of the Chrysanthine phthora to indicate the small hemitonion in the final cadence of φθορά νανὰ in the interval γα—βου:

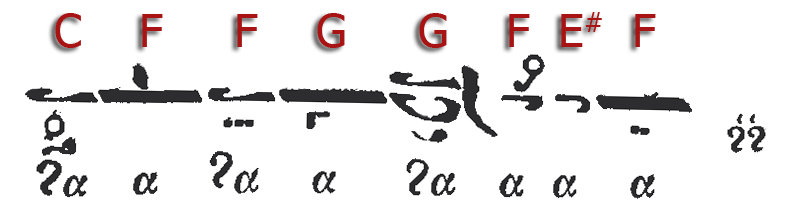
Exegesis of the traditional intonation of the enharmonic φθορά νανὰ (Chrysanthos 1832, p. 138, § 311)

Because the pentachord between kyrios and plagios tritos no longer existed in Chrysanthos' diapason system, the enharmonic phthora nana had only one phthongos in it, that between plagios tetartos (πλ δ′) and echos tritos (γ′). Hence, in the enharmonic genus of the nana melos, there was no real difference between ἦχος τρίτος and ἦχος βαρύς. Hence, while there was an additional intonation needed for the diatonic varys on the phthongos B ζω, the protovarys which was not unlike the traditional diatonic plagios devteros, the enharmonic exegesis of the traditional diatonic intonation of ἦχος βαρύς was as well located on the phthongos of ἦχος τρίτος:

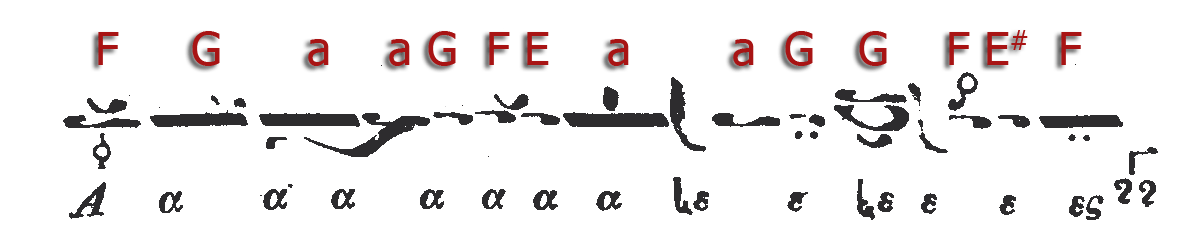
Enharmonic exegesis of the diatonic intonation of ἦχος βαρύς (Chrysanthos 1832, p. 140, § 313)

=== Smallest tones (hemitona) ===
Chrysanthos' concept of "half tone" (ἡμίτονον) should not be mistaken with the Latin semitonium which he called λεῖμμα (256:243), it was rather flexible, as it can be read in his chapter "about hemitonoi" (περὶ ἡμιτόνων):

Τὸ Ἡμίτονον δὲν ἐννοεῖ τὸν τόνον διηρημένον ἀκριβῶς εἰς δύο, ὡς τὰ δώδεκα εἰς ἓξ καὶ ἓξ, ἀλλ᾽ ἀορίστως· ἤγουν τὰ δώδεκα εἰς ὀκτὼ καὶ τέσσαρα, ἢ εἰς ἐννέα καὶ τρία, καὶ τὰ λοιπά. Διότι ὁ γα δι τόνος διαιρεῖται εἰς δύο διαστήματα, ἀπὸ τὰ ὁποῖα τὸ μὲν ἀπὸ τοῦ ὀξέος ἐπὶ τὸ βαρὺ εἶναι τριτημόριον· τὸ δὲ ἀπὸ τοῦ βαρέος ἐπὶ τὸ ὀξὺ, εἶναι δύο τριτημόρια, καὶ τὰ λοιπά. Εἰναι ἔτι δυνατὸν νὰ διαιρεθῃ καὶ ἀλλέως· τὸ ἡμίτονον ὃμως τοῦ βου γα τόνου καὶ τοῦ ζω νη, εἶναι τὸ μικρότατον, καὶ δὲν δέχεται διαφορετικὴν διαίρεσιν· διότι λογίζεται ὡς τεταρτημόριον τοῦ μείζονος τόνου· ἤγουν ὡς 3:12. [...] Καὶ τὸ λεῖμμα ἐκείνων, ἢ τὸ ἡμίτονον τῶν Εὐρωπαίων σι ουτ, εἶναι μικρότερον ἀπὸ τὸν ἡμέτερον ἐλάχιστον τόνον βου γα. Διὰ τοῦτο καὶ οἱ φθόγγοι τῆς ἡμετέρας διατονικῆς κλίμακος ἔχουσιν ἀπαγγέλίαν διάφορον, τινὲς μὲν ταὐτιζόμενοι, τινὲς δὲ ὀξυνόμενοι, καὶ τινες βαρυνόμενοι.

The hemitonon is not always the exact division into two halves like 12 into 6 and 6, it is less defined like the 12 into 8 and 4, or into 9 and 3 etc. So, the tonos γα δι [γ'—δ'] is divided into two intervals: the higher one is one third, the lower two thirds etc. The latter might be divided again, while a hemitonon of the tonos βου γα and ζω νη [β'—γ'] cannot be further divided, because they are regarded as the quarter of the great tone, which is 3:12.

[...] And the leimma of those [the Ancient Greeks] like the "semitonium" si ut of the Europeans are smaller than our small tone (ἐλάχιστος τόνος) βου γα [β'—γ']. Hence, the elements (φθόγγοι) of our diatonic scale are intoned in a slightly different way, some are just the same [ut, re, fa, sol], other are higher [la, si bemol] or lower [mi, si].

Chrysanthos' definition of a Byzantine hemitonon is related to the introduction of accidental phthorai. Concerning his own theory and the influence that it had on later theory, the accidental use of phthorai had two functions:

1. The notation of melodic attraction as part of a certain melos, which became important in the further development of modern Byzantine notation, especially within the school of Simon Karas.
2. The notation of modified diatonic scales, which became an important tool for the transcription of other modal traditions outside the Byzantine Octoechos (the so-called "exoteric music"): for instance, folk music traditions or other traditions of Ottoman art music like the transcription of certain makamlar.

==== The chroai and the notation of melodic attraction ====
The accidental phthorai had been used to notate details of melodic attraction, as dieseis in case of augmentation or ascending attraction or hypheseis in case of diminution or descending attraction.

About the phenomenon of temporary attraction which did not cause a change into another genus (μεταβολή κατὰ γένος), although it caused a microtonal change, he wrote in his eighth chapter "about the chroai" (περὶ χροῶν):

§. 265. Ἑστῶτες μὲν φθόγγοι εἶναι ἐκεῖνοι, τῶν ὁποίων οἱ τόνοι δὲν μεταπίπτουσιν εἰς τὰς διαφορὰς τῶν γενῶν, ἀλλὰ μένουσιν ἐπὶ μιᾶς τάσεως. Κινούμενοι δὲ ἢ φερόμενοι γθόγγοι εἲναι ἐκείνοι, τῶν ὁποίων οἱ τόνοι μεταβάλλονται εἰς τὰς διαφορὰς τῶν γενῶν, καὶ δὲν μένουσιν ἐπὶ μιᾶς τάσεως· ἣ, ὃ ταὑτὸν ἐστὶν, οἱ ποτὲ μὲν ἐλάσσονα, ποτὲ δὲ μείζονα δηλοῦντες τὰ διαστήματα, κατὰ τὰς διαφόρους συνθέσεις τῶν τετραχόρδων.

§. 266. Χρόα δὲ εἶναι εἰδικὴ διαίρεσις τοῦ γένους. Παρῆγον δὲ τὰς χρόας οἱ ἀρχαῖοι ἀπὸ τὴν διάφορον διαίρεσιν τῶν τετραχόρδων, ἀφήνοντες μὲν Ἑστῶτας φθόγγους τοῦς ἄκρους τοῦ τετραχόρδου· ποιοῦντες δὲ Κινουμένους τοὺς ἐν μέσῳ.

Fixed phthongoi, called "ἑστῶτες" because they remain unaltered by the different genera, are always defined by one proportion (length of the chord). Mobile phthongoi, called "κινούμενοι" because they are altered by the different genera, are not defined by just one proportion; in other words, concerning the different divisions of the tetrachord, their intervals are sometimes middle tones, sometimes large ones.

"Chroa" is a particular division within a certain genus. The ancient Greeks made the "chroai" through the different divisions of the tetrachord by leaving the external phthongoi fixed (ἑστῶτες) and by moving the ones called "κινούμενοι".

As a reference for the ancient Greeks, Chrysanthos offered some examples of tetrachord divisions taken from Euklid, which creates subdivisions within the same genus. Chrysanthos does not comment on the different quality between the phthorai which have a particular shape for a specific division, on the one hand, and the accidental use of those phthorai which he introduced in the second chapter about hemitonoi (footnote on p. 101), on the other hand. The accidental use of phthorai became later, in 1883, a subject of a synod; the oral transmission of melodic attraction, which differed between various local traditions, had been declined after the abundant use of accidental phthorai in different printed editions had confused it.

Besides, the introduction of the accidental phthora did not change the notation very much. They were perceived by performers as an interpretation without any obligation to follow, because there were various local traditions which were used to an alternative use of melodic attraction in the different melodic models used within a certain echos.

Only recently, during the 1990s, the reintroduction of abandoned late Byzantine neumes, re-interpreted into the context of the rhythmic Chrysanthine notation, had also been combined by a systematic notation of melodic attraction (μελωδικές ἕλξεις). This innovation had already been proposed by the Phanariot Simon Karas, but it was his student Lykourgos Angelopoulos who used this dieseis and hypheseis in a systematic way to transcribe a certain local tradition of melodic attraction. But it was somehow the result of distinctions between the intervals used by Western and Byzantine traditions, which finally tempted the details of the notation used by Karas' school.

==== Transcription of makamlar ====
In the last chapter of his third book "Plenty possible chroai" (Πόσαι αἱ δυναταὶ Χρόαι), Chrysanthos used with the adjective δυνατή a term which was connected with the Aristotelian philosophy of δύναμις (translated into Latin as "contingentia"), i.e. the potential of being outside the cause (ἐνέργεια) of the Octoechos, something has been modified there and it becomes something completely different within the context of another tradition.

This is Chrysanthos' systematic lists of modifications (the bold syllable had been modified by a phthora—hyphesis or diesis).

The first list is concerned about just one modification (-/+ 3):

Makamlar represented by the use of one accidental phthora
1 ὕφεσις	makamlar	1 δίεσις	makamlar
πα βου γα δι κε ζω νη	makam kürdî	πα βου γα δι κε ζω νη	makam bûselik
πα βου γα δι κε ζω νη	makam sâzkâr	πα βου γα δι κε ζω νη	makam hicâz
πα βου γα δι κε ζω νη	makam sabâ	πα βου γα δι κε ζω νη	makam hisâr
πα βου γα δι κε ζω νη	makam hüzzâm	πα βου γα δι κε ζω νη	makam eviç
πα βου γα δι κε ζω νη	makam acem	πα βου γα δι κε ζω νη	makam mâhûr
πα βου γα δι κε ζω νη	makam zâvîl	πα βου γα δι κε ζω νη	makam şehnâz

It can be observed that the unmodified diatonic scale already corresponded to certain makamlar, for instance ἦχος λέγετος (based on the ison E βου) corresponded to makam segâh. Nevertheless, if the phthongos βου (already a slightly flattened E) had an accidental hyphesis (ὕφεσις) as phthora, it corresponded to another makam, very closely related to segâh, but according to the particular use among Kurdish musicians who intoned this central degree of the makam even lower: it was called makam kürdî. Concerning the genus, chromatic tetrachords can be found in the makamlar hicâz, sabâ, and hüzzâm.

A second list of scales gives 8 examples out of 60 possible chroai which contain 2 modifications, usually in the same direction (the bold syllable had been modified by 2 phthorai—hypheseis or dieseis about -/+ 3 divisions, if not indicated alternatively):

Makamlar represented by the use of two accidental phthorai
2 ὑφέσεις	makamlar	2 διέσεις	makamlar
πα βου γα δι κε ζω νη	makam zâvîli kürdî	πα βου γα δι κε ζω νη	makam şehnâz-bûselik
πα βου γα δι κε ζω^{−6} νη	makam acem-aşîrân	πα βου γα δι κε ζω νη	makam hisâr-bûselik
πα βου γα^{+} δι κε ζω νη	plagios devteros scale	πα βου γα δι κε ζω νη	makam nişâbûrek
πα βου γα δι^{+} κε ζω νη	makam arazbâr	πα βου γα δι κε ζω νη	makam şehnâz

A third list gives "4 examples out of 160 possible chroai" which have 3 modifications with respect to the diatonic scale:

Makamlar represented by the use of three accidental phthorai
3 ὑφέσεις	makamlar	2 διέσεις & 1 ὕφεσις	makamlar
πα βου γα δι κε ζω νη	makam sünbüle	πα βου γα^{+6} δι κε ζω^{−6} νη	makam nişâbûr
πα βου γα δι κε ζω νη^{+}	makam karcığar	πα βου γα δι κε ζω^{−} νη	makam hümâyûn

Chrysanthos' approach had only been systematic with respect to the modification of the diatonic scale, but not with respect to the makamlar and its models (seyirler), as they had been collected by Panagiotes Halaçoğlu and his student Kyrillos Marmarinos, who already transcribed into late Byzantine Round notation in their manuscripts. A systematic convention concerning exoteric phthorai, how these models have to be transcribed according to the New Method, became the later subject of the treatises by Ioannis Keïvelis (1856) and by Panagiotes Keltzanides (1881).

Hence, the author of the Mega Theoretikon mode no efforts to offer a complete list of makamlar. Remarks that makam arazbâr "is a kind of echos varys which has to be sung according to the trochos system", made it evident that his tables have not been made in order to demonstrate that a composition of makam arazbâr can always be transcribed by the use of the main signature of echos varys. Nevertheless, the central treatise of the New Method already testified that the reform notation, as a medium of transcription, had been designed as a universal notation, which could be used to transcribe genres of Ottoman music other than just Orthodox Chant as the Byzantine heritage.

=== Chrysanthos' theory of rhythm and of the octoechos ===
The question of rhythm is the most controversial and difficult one, and an important part of the Octoechos because the method of how to do the thesis of the melos included not only melodic features like opening, transitional, or cadential formulas, but also their rhythmic structure.

In the third chapter about the performance concept of Byzantine chant ("Aufführungssinn"), Maria Alexandru discussed in her doctoral thesis rhythm as an aspect of the cheironomia of the cathedral rite (a gestic notation which had been originally used in the Kontakaria, Asmatika, and Psaltika, before the Papadic synthesis). On the other hand, the New Method redefined the different genres according psalmody and according to the traditional chant books like Octoechos mega, now Anastasimatarion neon, Heirmologion, Sticherarion, and the Papadike—the treatise which preceded since the 17th century an Anthology which included a collection Polyeleos compositions, chant sung during the Divine Liturgy (Trisagia, Allelouiaria, Cherouvika, Koinonika), but also a Heirmologion kalophonikon. According to the New Method, every genre was now defined by the tempo and its formulaic repertory with respect to the echos, which formed a certain "exegesis type".

Hence, it is not a surprise that Chrysanthos in his Theoretikon mega treats rhythm and meter in the second book together with the discussion of the great signs or hypostaseis (περὶ ὑποστάσεων). The controversial discussion of the "syntomon style" as it had been created by Petros Peloponnesios and his student Petros Byzantios was about rhythm, but the later rhythmic system of the New Method, which had been created two generations later, provoked a principle refusal of Chrysanthine notation among some traditionalists.

The new analytic use of Round notation established a direct relation of performance and rhythmic signs, which had already been a taboo since the 15th century, while the change of tempo was probably not an invention of the 19th century. At least since the 13th century, melismatic chant of the cathedral rite had been notated with abbreviations or ligatures (ἀργόν, or "slow") which presumably indicated a change to a slower tempo. Other discussions were about the quality of rhythm itself, if certain genres and its text had to be performed in a rhythmic or arhythmic way. In particular, the knowledge of the most traditional and simple method had been lost.

Mediating between tradition and innovation, Chrysanthos had the characteristic Phanariot creativity. While he was writing about the metric feet (πώδαι) as rhythmic patterns or periods, mainly based on Aristides Quintilianus and Aristoxenos, he treated the arseis and theseis simultaneously with the Ottoman timbres düm and tek of the usulümler, and concluded, that only a very experienced musician can know which are the rhythmic patterns that can be applied to a certain thesis of the melos. He analysed, for instance, the rhythmic periods as he transcribed them from Petros Peloponnesios' Heirmologion argon.

Especially concerning the ethic aspect of music, melody as well as rhythm, Chrysanthos combined knowledge about ancient Greek music theory with his experience of the use of makamlar and usulümler in the ceremony of whirling dervishes. There was a collective ethos of rhythm, because the ceremony and its composition (ayinler) followed a strict sequence of usulümler, which varied rarely and only slightly. There was a rather individual ethic concept for the combination of makamlar (tarqib), which was connected with the individual constitution of the psyche and with the inspiration of an individual musician on the other side.

In the fifth book (chapt. 3: τωρινὸς τρόπος τοῦ μελίζειν "the contemporary way of chant", pp. 181-192), he also wrote about a certain effect on the auditory that a well-educated musician is capable to create and described contemporary types of musicians with different levels of education (the empiric, the artistic, and the experienced type). They are worthy of study because the role of notation in transmission becomes evident in Chrysanthos' description of the psaltes' competences.

- The empiric type did not know notation at all, but they knew the heirmologic melos by heart, so that they could apply it to any text, but sometimes they were sure if they repeated, what they wished repeat. So what they sang, could be written down by the artistic type, if the latter thought that the empiric psaltis was good enough. The latter case showed a certain competence which Chrysanthos already expected on the level of the empiric type.
- The artistic type could read, study, and transcribe all the four chant genres, and thus, they were able to repeat everything in a precise and identical way. This gave them the opportunity to create an idiomelon of their own, if they simply followed the syntax of a given text by the use of open (ἀτελεῖς καταλήξεις), closing (ἐντελεῖς καταλήξεις) and final cadences (τελικαὶ καταλήξεις). Hence, the artistic type could study other musicians and learn from their art, as long as they imitated them in their own individual way—especially in the papadic (kalophonic) genre.
- Only the latter experienced type understood the emotive effects of music well enough, so that they could invent text and music in exactly the way, as they wished to move the soul of the auditory.

For the eight echoi of the Octoechos (book 4) and for the use of rhythm (book 2), Chrysanthos described the effects that both could create, usually with reference to ancient Greek scientists and philosophers. Despite Chrysanthos agreeing with the Arabo-Persian concept of musicians as humour makers (mutriban) and with the dramaturgy of rhythm in a mystic context, his ethic concept of music collectively concerned the Octoechos and individually concerned rhythm, at least in theory. While the ethos of the echoi were characterised very generally (since Plato), the "three tropes of rhythm" (book 2, chapter 12) were distinguished as systaltic (συσταλτικὴ, λυπηρὸς "sad"), diastaltic (διασταλτικὴ, θυμὸς "rage"), and hesychastic (ἡσυχαστικὴ, ἡσυχία "peace, silence", connected with an Athonite mystic movement). Systaltic and diastaltic effects were created by the beginning of the rhythmical period (if it starts on an arsis or thesis) and by the use of the tempo (slow or fast). The hesychastic trope required a slow but smooth rhythm, which used simple and rather equal time proportions. The agitating effect of the fast diastaltic trope could become enthusiastic and cheerful by the use of hemiolic rhythm.

In conclusion, Chrysanthos' theory was less academic than experimental and creative, and the tradition was rather an authorisation of the creative and open-minded experiments of the most important protagonists around the Patriarchate and the Fener district, but also with respect to patriotic and anthropological projects in the context of ethnic and national movements.

== Makamlar as an echos aspect ==
Medieval Arabic sources describe the important impact that the Byzantine and Greek traditions of Damascus had for the development of an Arab music tradition, when the melodies (since 1400 maqamat) had already been described as naġme. Today the Greek reception of Ottoman makamlar by the transcription into Byzantine neume notation can be recognised as a process in six different stages or steps.

The first were teretismata or kratemata which allowed various experiments with rhythm and melos like the integration of Persian chant. The second step was an interest for particular transitions inspired by makam compositions like Petros Bereketis' heirmoi of the early 18th century, in which he used certain makam intervals as a kind of change of the genus (μεταβολή κατὰ γένος) for refined transitions between certain echoi. The third stage was a systematic collection of seyirler, in order to adapt the written transmission of Byzantine chant to other traditions. The fourth and most important step was a reform of the notation as the medium of written transmission, in order to adapt it to the scales and the tone system which was the common reference for all musicians of the Ottoman Empire. The fifth step was the systematic transcription of the written transmission of makamlar into modern Byzantine neumes, the Mecmuase, a form of Anthology which was used by Court and Sephardic musicians as well, but usually as text books. The sixth and last step was the composition of certain makamlar as part of the Octoechos tradition, after external music had turned into something internal. The exoteric had become esoteric.

=== "Stolen" music ===
Petros Peloponnesios (about 1735–1778), the teacher of the Second Music School of the Patriarchate, was born in Peloponnese, but as a child he grew up at Smyrna within its various music traditions. An Ottoman anecdote about "the thief Petros" (Hırsız Petros) testified that his capability to memorize and write down music was so astonishing that he was able to steal his melodies from everywhere and to make them up as an own composition, which convinced the audience more than the musician from whom he once had stolen it. His capacity as listener included an ability to understand any music according to its own tradition (this was not necessarily the Octoechos for a Greek socialised at Smyrna), so that he was believed to be its original creator. Concerning the competence of notating music, he was not only well known as the inventor of an own method to transcribe music into Late Byzantine neumes. The use of notation as a medium of written transmission had never had such an important role within most of the Ottoman music traditions, but in case of "Hırsız Petros" a lot of musicians preferred to ask him for his permission,before they published their own compositions. To this day, the living tradition of monodic Orthodox chant is dominated by Petros Peloponnesios' own compositions and his reformulation of the traditional chant books heirmologion (the katavaseion melodies) and sticherarion (his Doxastarion syntomon is today distributed in most of the Menaia, as they are used in several National-Orthodox traditions).

In Petros' time, Panagiotes Halacoğlu and Kyrillos Marmarinos, Metropolit of Tinos—other musicians, who had grown up with Alevide and Sufi compositions and with the makam seyirler of the Ottoman court and who knew not just Byzantine neumes, but also other notation systems of the Empire—were collecting the seyirler by a transcription into Late Byzantine notation.

The next step, which followed the systematic collection of seyirler, was its classification and integration according to the Octoechos. The different usulümler were just transcribed under their names by the syllables "düm" and "tek" (for instance δοὺμ τεκ-κὲ τὲκ) with the number of beats or a division of one beat. The neume transcription just mentioned the makam and the usul at the beginning of the piece, and the main question was which modal signature of the Octoechos had to be used to transcribe a certain makam, and which additional phthora was needed to indicate the particular intonation by a change of genos (μεταβολή κατὰ γένος), the integrative concept since the Hagiopolites.

=== The makamlar of the diatonic echos varys ===
One important innovation of the reformed neume notation and its "New Method" of transcription was the heptaphonic solfeggio, which was not based on the Western equal temperature but on the frets of the tambur: a long-necked lute which had replaced the oud at the Ottoman court (mehterhane) by the end of the 17th century, and which also took its place in the representation of the tone system. In his reformulation of the sticheraric melos, Petros Peloponnesios defined most of the echos-tritos models as enharmonic (phthora nana), but the diatonic varys ("grave mode") was no longer based on the tritos pentachord B flat—F according to the tetraphonic tone system ("trochos system"); it was based according to the tambur frets on an octave on B natural on a fret called "arak", so that the pentachord had been diminished to a tritone. Thus, some melodic models which were well known from Persian, Kurdish, or other music traditions of the Empire could be integrated within echos varys.

For the printed chant books, a New Method also had to be created which concerned the transcription of the makamlar. Several theoretical treatises followed Chrysanthos and some of them treated the New Method of transcribing exoteric music: which meant folklore of different regions of the Balkans and the Eastern Mediterranean which often used tunes far from the Byzantine Octoechos tradition, but also makamlar traditions of the Court and of Sufi lodges (tekke).

=== Panagiotes Keltzanides' method of exoteric music ===
Panagiotes Keltzanides' "Methodical Teaching of the Theory and Practice of External music" (1881) is only one of few complete treatises which continue the theoretical reflection of Panagiotes Halaçoğlu and Kyrillos Marmarinos. It also contained a reproduction of a manuscript by Konstantinos the Protopsaltes with a representation of the tambur frets and interval calculations referred to certain makamlar and echoi.

The whole book is written about a composition of Beyzade Yangu Karaca and Çelebi Yangu, a didactic chant to memorize each makam like each great sign in the Mega Ison according to the school of John Glykys, and their composition was arranged by Konstantinos the Protopsaltes, and transcribed by Stephanos the Domestikos and Theodoros Phokaeos. Konstantinos' negative opinion concerning the reform notation had been well-known, so it was left to his students to transcribe the method of his teaching and its subjects. It became the obvious motivation for Panagiotes Keltzanides' publication, thus, he taught a systematic transcription method for all makamlar according to the New Method.

The main part of his work is the first part of the seventh chapter. The identification of a certain makam by a fret name makes the fret name to a substitute of a solmisation syllable used for the basis tone.

Thus, "dügah" (D: πα, α') represents all makamlar which belong to the echos protos; "segah" (E: βου, β') represents all makamlar of the diatonic echos devteros; "çargah" (F: γα, γ') represents all makamlar of echos tritos; "neva" (G: δι, δ') represents all makamlar of the echos tetartos; "hüseyni" (a: κε, πλ α') represents all makamlar of the echos plagios tou protou; "hicaz" as makam lies on "dügah" (D: πα in chromatic solfeggio, πλ β') and represents the different hard chromatic forms of echos plagios tou devterou; "arak" (B natural: ζω, υαρ) represents the diatonic echos varys; and finally, "rast" (C: νη, πλ δ') represents all makamlar of echos plagios tou tetartou.

It is evident that the whole solution is based on Chrysanthos' New Method, and it is no longer compatible with the Papadike and the former solfeggio based on the trochos system. On the other hand, the former concept of Petros Bereketis to use a makam for a temporary change of the genus is still present in Keltzanides' method. Every makam can now be represented and even develop its own melos like any other echos, because the proper interval structure of a certain makam is indicated by the use of additional phthorai which were sometimes named after a certain makam, as long as the phthora was representative for just one makam.

For instance, the seyir of makam sabâ (μακὰμ σεμπὰ) was defined as an aspect of echos protos (ἦχος πρῶτος) on fret "dügah", despite there being no chromaticism on γα (F) in any melos of echos protos. There are several compositions in echos varys—also from the great teachers like Gregorios the Protopsaltes—which are in fact compositions in makam sabâ, but it has no proper phthora which would clearly indicate the difference between echos varys and makam sabâ (see also Chrysanthos' method of transcription in his chroa chapter). A Greek singer from Istanbul would recognize it anyway, but it became so common that it might be regarded as an aspect of echos varys by psaltes of the living tradition. On the other hand, the intonation of makam müstear has its own characteristic phthora (φθορά μουσταχὰρ) which is often used in printed chant books. Though it is treated as an aspect of echos legetos, according to Keltzanides, who treated it as an aspect of the diatonic echos devteros on fret "segah", its intonation is so unique that it will be even recognised by an audience who is not as familiar with makam music, at least as something odd in an echos which already requires a very experienced psaltes.

In 1881, the transcription of makam compositions was nothing new because several printed anthologies had been published by Phanariotes: Pandora and Evterpe by Theodoros Phokaeos and Chourmouzios the Archivist in 1830, Harmonia by Vlachopoulos in 1848, Kaliphonos Seiren by Panagiotes Georgiades in 1859, Apanthisma by Ioannis Keïvelis in 1856 and in 1872, and Lesvia Sappho by Nikolaos Vlahakis in 1870 in another reform notation invented in Lesbos. New Method was without any doubt the systematic approach to understand the whole system of makamlar as part of the Octoechos tradition.

== Octoechos melopœia according to the New Method ==
The Byzantine echoi are currently used in the monodic hymns of the Eastern Orthodox Churches in Bulgaria, Greece, Romania, Croatia, Albania, Serbia, Macedonia, Italy, and Russia, and in several Oriental Orthodox Churches of the Middle East.

According to medieval theory, the plagioi (oblique) echoi mentioned above (Hagiopolitan Octoechos) employ the same scales: the final degrees of the plagioi echoi are a fifth below with respect to the ones of the kyrioi echoi. There are typically two main notes that defined each of the Byzantine tones (ἦχοι, гласове): the base degree (basis) or ison which is sung as a typical drone with the melody by ison-singers (isokrates), and the final degree (finalis) of the mode on which the hymn ends.

In current traditional practice, there are more than one basis in certain mele, and in some particular cases the base degree of the mode is not even the degree of the finalis. The Octoechos cycles as they exist in different chant genres are no longer defined as entirely diatonic. Some of the chromatic or enharmonic mele had replaced the former diatonic ones entirely, so often the pentachord between the finales no longer exists, or the mele of certain kyrioi echoi used in more elaborated genres are transposed to the finalis of its plagios: for instance, the papadic melos of echos protos.

Their melodic patterns were created by four generations of teachers at the "New Music School of the Patriarchate" (Constantinople/Istanbul), which redefined the Ottoman tradition of Byzantine chant between 1750 and 1830 and transcribed it into the notation of the New Method since 1814.

Whereas in Gregorian chant a mode referred to the classification of chant according to the local tonaries and the obligatory psalmody, the Byzantine echoi were rather defined by an oral tradition regarding how to do the thesis of the melos, which included melodic patterns like the base degree (ison), open or closed melodic endings or cadences (cadential degrees of the mode), and certain accentuation patterns. These rules or methods defined melopœia, the different ways of creating a certain melos. The melodic patterns were further distinguished according to different chant genres, which traditionally belong to certain types of chant books, often connected with various local traditions.

=== Melopœia of new exegeseis types ===
According to the New Method, the whole repertory of hymns used in Orthodox chant had been divided into four chant genres or exegesis types, defined by their tempo and melodic patterns used for each echos. On one hand, their names were taken from traditional chant books, on the other hand, different forms, which had never been connected in hymnology, were now put together by a purely musical definition of melos which had been summed up by a very broad concept of more or less elaborated psalmody:

- Papadic hymns are melismatic troparia sung during the Divine Liturgy (Cheruvikon, Koinonikon, etc.): according to the New Method, slow in tempo and fast in Teretismoi or Kratemata (sections using abstract syllables). The name "papadic" refers to the treatise of psaltic art called "papadike" (παπαδική), and its elaborated form is based on kalophonic compositions (between the 14th and the 17th century). Hence, also kalophonic compositions over models taken from the sticherarion (so-called stichera kalophonika or anagrammatismoi) or from the heirmologion (heirmoi kalophonikoi) were part of the papadic genre and used its melos (Papadic Octoechos).
- Sticheraric hymns are taken from the book sticherarion (στιχηράριον), and its text is composed in hexameter; today, the Greek chant book is called Doxastarion ("the book of Doxasticha"). According to the New Method, there is a slow (Doxastarion argon) and a fast way (Doxastarion syntomon) of singing its melos; the tempo used in syntomon is 2 times faster than that of the papadic melos. Since the old repertory, there has been always a distinction between stichera idiomela, stichera with own melodies (which are usually sung only once during the year), and stichera avtomela—metrical and melodical models which belong less to the repertory itself: they were rather used to compose several stichera prosomeia, so that these melodies were sung on several occasions. The name Doxastarion derived from the practice to introduce these chants by one or both stichoi of the small doxology. Hence, stichera were also called Doxastika and regarded as a derivative of psalmody, at least according to Chrysanthos of Madytos. But also elaborated psalmody and their torsos like certain troparia as trisagion or the Hesperinos psalm 140.1 κύριε ἐκέκραξα (kekragaria), and the cycle of eleven Doxastika (stichera heothina) of the Matins Gospels represented models of the sticheraric melos.
- Heirmologic hymns are taken from the heirmologion (εἱρμολόγιον). Their meter is defined by the odes of the canon, and their content according to the first 9 biblical odes, in the poetic composition is based on melodic models called "heirmos" (εἱρμός). According to the New Method, there is a slow (Katavaseion) and a fast way (Heirmologion syntomon) of singing it; the tempo is up to two times faster than that of the sticheraric melos. The melos follows strict melodic patterns which are also applied to texts sung from the service book the Menaion.
- Troparic hymns are taken from the book of the Great Octoechos (Slavonic Oсмогласникъ, "Osmoglasnik") and its melos is memorised by the most frequently sung—several times each day according to the echos of the week—resurrection hymns (apolytikia anastasima) and theotokia (troparic hymns dedicated to the Mother of God). According to the Anastasimatarion neon of the New Method, the troparic melos has the same tempo as the fast heirmologic melos, but in certain modes different melodic patterns and genus.

This is the distinction as it has been taught in most of the chant manuals today, but at the beginning of the 19th century, Chrysanthos defined the four genres in a slightly different way:

Οἱ δὲ Ἐκκλησιαστικοὶ μουσικοὶ κατὰ τὰ διάφορα εἴδη τῆς ψαλμῳδίας ἔψαλλον καὶ ἔγραφον, ποιοῦτες καὶ ῥυθμοὺς, καθ᾽ οὓς ἐχειρονόμουν, καὶ ἑφευρίσκοντες καὶ μέλη, ἁρμόζοντα τοῖς σκοπουμένοις. Ἐσύνθετον δὲ καὶ θέσεις χαρακτήρων μουσικῶν, ἵνα συνοπτικῶς γράφωσι τὸ ψαλλόμενον, καὶ παραδίδωσι τοῖς μαθηταῖς εὐμεθόδως τὰ πονήματάτων. Ὅτε δὲ καὶ οἱ μαθηταὶ τούτων ἑμελοποίων, ἐμιμοῦτο τὸν τρόπον τῶν διδασκάλων (*). [...] Ταῦτα τὰ εἴδη τῆς ψαλμῳδίας ἀνάγονται εἰς τέσσαρα γένη μελῶν· Στηχηραρικὸν παλαιὸν, Στιχηραρικὸν νέον, Παπαδικὸν, Εἱρμολογικόν.

The church musicians sang and wrote the different forms of psalmody, they created the rhythm, and over those they performed the cheironomies (hand signs), and invented the mele according to their needs. So they composed their theseis of the musical neumes, how to sing the synoptic signs, and by their own examples the students could learn the method and how to follow it. Thus, the students learnt the thesis of the melos and imitated their teachers in their own compositions [footnote quoting Manuel Chrysaphes]. [...] These forms of psalmody can be reduced to four kinds of melos: the old sticheraric, the new sticheraric, the papadic, and the heirmologic.

Changes in the chant tradition were justified by a quotation of Manuel Chrysaphes, where he mentioned that John Koukouzeles made up his own compositions in the kalophonic performance of a sticheron, but he always followed the traditional models "step by step." By using this quotation, Chrysanthos tried to justify the radical innovations by the "New Music School of the Patriarchate" as its teachers' way of integrating the New Method within the tradition of Byzantine chant.

The detailed transcription of the thesis of the melos and its various methods within the medium of the New Method redefined the genres according to parameters like tempo, rhythm, and the melodic treatment of text (between syllabic and highly melismatic). Only later, since the end of the 19th century, treatises were published in Greek by Kosmas, Metropolit of Madytos (1897, vol. 1, pp. 42-69), and in Bulgarian by Peter Sarafov (1912, pp. 90-119). Both editions contained an introduction to systematically teach the formulas of each echos according to its troparic, heirmologic, sticheraric and papadic melos (usually a catalogue of the exposition and the different cadence formulas used in each melos).

The redefinition of each chant genre with an own melos and tempo was part of the process, which preceded its first distribution as printed chant books. Parallel to the work of the teachers at the "New Music School of the Patriarchate", which started about the middle of the 18th century, there was a later political process in which the Ottoman Empire was split into several independent nations (between the late 19th and the early 20th century). These nations were declared by a kind of national church, which defined itself as its own Patriarchate that was independent (avtokephalos), in front of the former Patriarchate of Constantinople. For each of the nations, the tradition of Orthodox chant had to be redefined, and the introduction of printed editions was an important part of it. But already the definition of the four chant genres had to face characteristic conflicts, and they will be described exemplarily by means of the heirmologion and of the sticherarion.

==== Debates about the sticheraric melos ====
Chrysanthos already mentioned a traditional and a modern way of performing the sticheraric chant, and continued:

Καὶ τὸ μὲν παλαιὸν στιχηραρικὸν μέλος εἶναι τοιοῦτον, οἷον εὑρίσκεται εἰς τὸ παλαιὸν Ἀναστασιματάριον, εἰς τὰ παλαιὰ στιχηράρια, καὶ εἰς τὸ Δοξαστικάριον Ἰακώβου. Μελίζονται λοιπὸν μὲ στιχηραρικὸν μέλος Δοξαστικὰ, στιχηρὰ, ἀναστάσιμα, αἶνοι, προσόμοια, ἰδιόμελα ἑωθινά.

§. 403. Τὸ δὲ νέον στιχηραρικὸν μέλος εἶναι τοιοῦτον, οἷον εὑρίσκεται εἰς τὸ Ἀναστασιματάριον Πέτρου τοῦ Πελοποννησίου. Μελίζονται λοιπὸν μὲ τοιοῦτον μέλος, Δοξαστικὰ, στιχηρὰ, ἀναστάσιμα, ἐξαποστειλάρια, αἶνοι, προσόμοια, ἰδιόμελα, ἑωθινὰ, καθίσματα, ἀντίφωνα, εἰσοδικά.

The old sticheraric melos is the one found in the old Anastasimatarion (the cycle of 11 stichera heothina in the Anastasimatarion of Panagiotes the New Chrysaphes), in the old Sticheraria, and in the Doxastikarion of Iakovos. Hence, the doxastika, the stichera, the anastasima (elaborate resurrection hymns), the ainoi (Laudate-psalms), the prosomoia and idiomela, and the stichera heothina (see Matins Gospel) are made of the sticheraric melos.

The new sticheraric melos is the one preserved in the Anastasimatarion of Petros Peloponnesios. Hence, the doxastika, the stichera, the anastasima, the exaposteilaria, the ainoi, the prosomoia and idiomela, the stichera heothina, the kathismata and antiphona, and the eisodika are made of this melos.

It is surprising that he did not mention Petros' Doxastarion syntomon, but only his Anastasimatarion, which should not be mistaken with the Anastasimatarion neon, published by Petros Ephesios in 1820. It is not less surprising, that the psalmodic composition of the vesper psalm 140.1 Κύριε ἐκέκραξα (kekragarion) in the Anastasimatarion was listed by Chrysanthos as example of the papadic melos.

Probably Chrysanthos had an earlier plan, before Petros Ephesios realised the first printed editions. There are copied manuscripts of a rather unknown Anastasimatarion syntomon ascribed to Petros Peloponnesios, and it was assumed that Gregorios the Protopsaltes transcribed it according to the New Method. This manuscript had a second part as well, which was a Sticherarion including the fixed (μηναῖον) and the moveable cycle (τριῴδιον, πεντηκοστάριον) which contained not only the stichera prosomeia and the troparia, but also the theotokia, kontakia, and eisodika of the sticherarion. In fact, this Anastasimatarion syntomon was created during Petros' lifetime, but not by him; it is usually identified with the name of its publisher Ioannes the Protopsaltes, but it was created by him and Daniel the Protopsaltes. Although the latter is not mentioned in a particular print edition of the Anastasimataria because it included not only the Petros' Anastasimatarion neon and the stichera heothina, but also the pasapnoaria, the anabathmoi, the heirmologia (katavasion and syntomon), and a certain Anastasimatarion syntomon composed in a melos, which is today called "troparic." The "fast sticheraric melos" represented by "Petros Peloponnesios'" Anastasimatarion syntomon was probably meant as an early name for the "troparic melos."

There is another manuscript (Ms. 716 of the National Library of Athens) which contains the transcription of Petros' sticheraric compositions, as they are today part of the printed editions called Anastasimatarion neon which is not mentioned here, since the "old sticheraric melos" was rather represented by the traditionalist Iakovos who opposed the rhythmic style of Petros' Doxastarion syntomon. The names of the chant genres as a category of the melos and its identification with a certain tempo (once the method of the thesis) were obviously taken from the traditional chant books, but its redefinition was based on a universal concept of psalmody; this was not the reception of Panagiotes the New Chrysaphes' Anthology, who once tried to follow the tradition into the footsteps of Manuel Chrysaphes, but the oral hyphos style developed by Ioannes of Trapezountios. The "troparic melos" was the simpler psalmody with respect to the traditional simple psalmody. The New Method created four octoechos cycles—one for each genre, but there was no longer a strong connection between the traditional method to do the thesis of the melos according to the convention of a certain book, and the four octoechos cycles had also been used to integrate several melodies, which so far had not been regarded as part of the Octoechos tradition.

Concerning the sticheraric melos as the realisation of the repertory of the old book sticherarion, the strict rhythmic form of the melos, as it had been created by Petros Peloponnesios, had been criticised and refused by Iakovos the Protopsaltes, a teacher of the following generation. It seems that his opinion had a great influence on the fourth generation of teachers, who were responsible for the reform notation and the preparation of the printed edition: especially because Iakovos' Doxastarion argon was called by Chrysanthos the "old sticheraric method." Nevertheless, the first printed "Doxastarion syntomon" by Petros Peloponnesios and his composition of the Kekragaria, as they had been published in the "Anastasimatarion neon" by Petros Ephesios, suggested the style that soon became the widely accepted example of the "sticheraric melos."

Iakovos' Doxastarion argon had rather been transcribed according to the "papadic" Octoechos, for two reasons. First, it was indeed the closest realisation with respect to the models given by the revised 14th-century sticheraria. Second, the different chant genres had not been so strictly separated in those sticheraria, due to the synthesis of all great signs in the Papadike, but also due to a synthesis of the phonic neumes which used the same combinations for the cadences as those used in the contemporary manuscripts of the heirmologion. Iakovos, like many other Protopsaltes of the Patriarchate, left the work of the notator to his students: usually the second Domestikos who had to write his contributions to the psaltic art into notation. Thus, his performances of the doxastika had first been written into Late Byzantine neumes by Georgios of Crete.

Iakovos criticised the rhythmic style of the Sticherarion, published as "Doxastarion syntomon" by Petros Peloponnesios in order to re-establish a simple sticheraric melos. Comparative studies found only a few similarities between the models of the 14th-century sticheraria and Petros' realisations. Iakovos' own realisations had been transcribed and published by Chourmouzios the Archivist, on the basis of the scripts left by Iakovos' student and Chourmouzios' teacher, Georgios of Crete. On the other hand, Iakovos' alternative concept of a "slow sticheraric melos" (μέλος στιχηραρικὸν ἀργὸν) often did not strictly follow the old models; it was rather adapted to the contemporary formulas of the melos, in a style which had often prolonged the conventional method by the "kalophonic method.." Nevertheless, it was meant as an abridgement of what has been taught as the "old sticherarion" since the 17th century.

Until the 1880s, important masters like Konstantinos the Protopsaltes followed Iakovos in his negative attitude toward the New Method. He still wrote notated manuscripts and categorically refused the use of modern notation. He disregarded the New Method as a cause of corruption and an obstacle in the path to the Byzantine tradition. But he arranged a compromise: an argosyntomon version that was not as short as Petros Peloponnesios' compositions and not as long as the realisations published as Iakovos' Doxastarion. In liturgical practice, Iakovos' Doxastarion argon must have still proven to be too long, but Konstantinos Terzopoulos could demonstrate that Konstantinos' Doxastarion argonsyntomon was not simply an abbreviation of Iakovos' compositions. The vocal range became even wider, so that Konstantinos' versions usually supported certain kalophonic elements, as they had still been present in the style called "sticherarikos argos."

A synoptic analysis, which compares different layers of the tradition, can always find interesting parallels to the old models. Hence, it is important not to underestimate the last generations who were still familiar with the papadic school. For psaltes of the current tradition, they still provide the key for all layers of the older tradition. In fact, the biggest collection, which had remained mostly unpublished, are Chourmouzios' transcriptions into the reform notation of the New Method. He made two cycles of the "old sticherarion" based on 14th-century sticheraria, 4 volumes based on the 17th-century notation written by Germanos of New Patras, and 5 other volumes based on the transcription of Germanos' contemporary Panagiotes the New Chrysaphes. On this background, even Iakovos' Doxastarion argon was only slow in comparison with Petros Peloponnesios; the traditional psaltic art had enlarged the stichera to such a degree that an abridgement had become necessary—a project which started with Petros Peloponnesios' teacher Ioannis Trapezountios and his foundation of the "New Music School of the Patriarchate."

On one hand, it was evident that the oral tradition of the sticheraric method was confused between the conventional and the kalophonic method. Occasionally, the mixture had probably also been useful for a flexible practice because kalophonic techniques like teretismata helped to adapt to the length of the ritual during greater feasts. On the other hand, a skilled protopsaltes who was interested in demonstrating his knowledge of the kalophonic art could also integrate kalophonic elements in shorter performances, and he was imitated by other, less experienced psaltes who appreciated the performance.

For these reasons, we find manuscripts of the sticherarion kalophonikon written during the 1780s, which have about 1900 pages just for the fixed cycle of the menaion with ca. 600 different compositions (stichera kalophonika and anagrammatismoi) about 200 models, because usually these models had been divided into two or three more or less open sections. The length of the performance was so expansive that this book had no practical use for the ceremonies. Hence, only extracts had been published in printed anthologies called mathematarion ("book of exercises" that also included traditional mathemata like Mega Ison). Konstantinos' abbreviation of Iakovos' slow sticheraric melos indicates that Iakovos' abridged sticheraric compositions had already been too long for practical use, and in the editions of his students, Georgios of Crete and Chourmouzios, they had presumably not been distinctive enough from the papadic melos. Chourmouzios' transcription had been printed 6 years before Stephanos the Domestikos' publication of Konstantinos' Doxastarion.

One kolon καὶ τόκῳ ζῶσα πρέσβευε διηνεκῶς·, taken from the eighth section of the Doxastikon oktaechon Θεαρχίῳ νεύματι (Dormition of the Theotokos on 15 August), might illustrate the motivation of the New Method to abbreviate the traditional method of doing the thesis of the sticheraric melos:

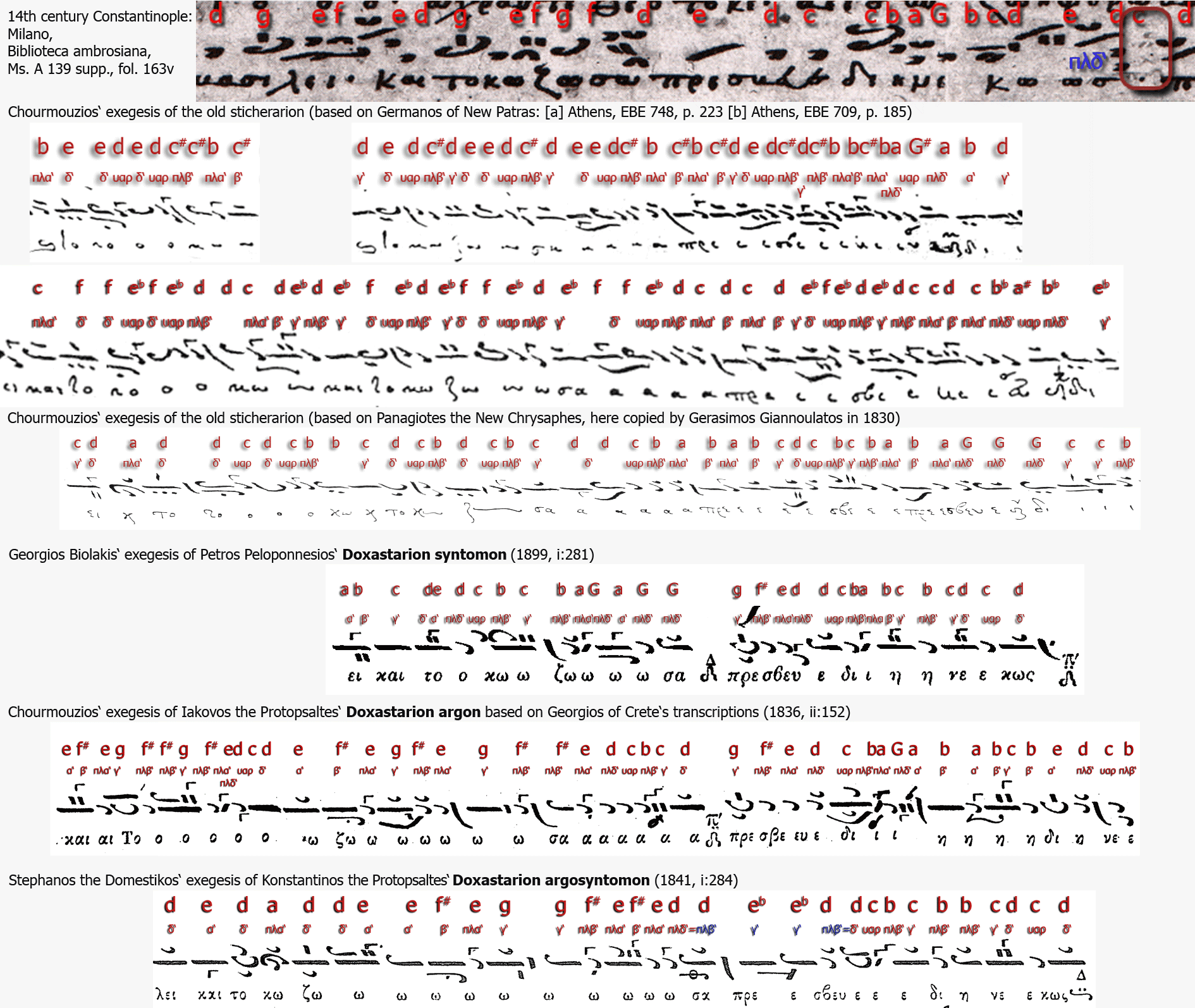
Doxastikon oktaechon Θεαρχίῳ νεύματι—one kolon taken from the old sticherarion and several transcriptions according to the traditional method and according to the abridged versions of the New Method.

This composition, one of three of the sticheraric repertory which pass through all the 8 echoi, had never been a subject of a kalophonic composition. This is because it could not be subdivided into two or three sections like most of the stichera of the 14th-century sticherarion, which did pass through one or two other echoi close to the one indicated by the main signature.

In the eighth section when the melos has arrived the eighth mode (ἦχος πλάγιος τοῦ τετάρτου), the psaltes has to explore the highest possible register of the voice for quite a long time. Already in the edition of the 14th-century sticherarion, which had been revised by John Koukouzeles, the cadence at the end of the section dedicated to the echos tritos establishes the plagios cadence not in the lower (υαρ B flat), but in the upper fifth (υαρ c). This transposition (μεταβολή κατὰ τόνον) causes a shift of the ambitus about two pentachords higher, which is the interval of a major ninth, and prepares the melos within the tetartos octave G—d—g with the upper tetrachord (δ' d—α' e—β' f sharp—γ' g).

Today, psaltes are most familiar with the virtuosic salto into the upper octave g in the "fast sticheraric" composition of Petros Peloponnesios. The voice does not get tired within the upper register because the singer jumps only once and for a short moment into the upper tetrachord, so it gives the impression of singing the tetartos melos one octave higher (in fact, not higher than the upper third).

In comparison with the model and the other realisations, it is evident that the psaltes usually have to sing in the higher register starting from the section of echos varys, and even Iakovos' Doxastarion argon, this most elaborated realisation by Chourmouzios within the New Method which is closest to the traditional realisations in the manuscripts, had also been composed as an abbreviation of the traditional method, though in opposition of Petros' syntomon-style.

In this kolon already the 14th-century sticherarion had plenty of transpositions. For this reason, every example was transcribed by letter notation as thetic symbols on one line and by a dynamic symbol according to the papadic parallage on another line (each descending step by a plagios formula, and each ascending one by a kyrios formula). For an easier comparison, the thetic symbol is transcribed so that the Doxastikon oktaechon always starts on a κε (α'), even if it has been transcribed a fifth lower as D πα (α'), as in some of the printed editions or manuscripts.

In the old sticherarion, the kolon is simply set in the tetrachord of tetartos, but the great sign or hypostasis xeron klasma (ξηρὸν κλάσμα) preceding the kolon at υασίλει· causes a change to the enharmonic genus (μεταβολή κατὰ γένος) and to the triphonic tone system (μεταβολή κατὰ σύστημα) of the phthora nana, and it prepares the medial signature of πλδ' on c νη'. As Manuel Chrysaphes explained, the use of phthora nana causes the melos of echos tritos to finally close on a cadence of echos plagios tetartos. Hence, the diatonic tetartos parallage, which use the devteros phthongos β' (f sharp), now turns the same into f natural as the tritos phthongos γ'. From here, the medial signature πλ δ' at the end of the following kolon on c is prepared, so the thesis of the melos uses here the melos of phthora nana, as it can be found in the final cadence of the transcriptions. But the use of phthora nana, unlike a conventional transposition (μεταβολή κατὰ τόνον), does not require a second transposition. If the same melos uses the lower register between c (γ') and G (πλ δ') and the lower tetrachord D (πλ α')—G (πλ δ'), the nana melos will find its way back to the phthongos on G (πλ δ').

Chourmouzios transcribed the νεάγιε νανὰ cadence transposed a third lower on a (πλ δ') when he followed the method of Germanos of New Patras (EBE 748), or a second lower on b flat (πλ δ') in his own composition according to the style παλαιὸν (EBE 709), which is still close to his transcription of Germanos. A third exegesis of the old sticheron follows in the footsteps of Panagiotes the New Chrysaphes and his sticherarion according to an horologic order, represented here in a copy by Gerasimos Giannoulatos. This version transposes the nana cadence a tetrachord lower on G (πλ δ'). As for the traditional method of the sticherarion, the end of the kolon διηνεκῶς· does not fit into the synapsis because it is composed as a long melisma, unlike the three printed versions, according to the New Method. This way, the kolon of the old sticherarion has been divided into two sections and both end on the same signature and the phthongos of πλ δ', however it has been transposed.

The New Method established, since Petros Peloponnesios, another more symmetrical subdivision of the kolon with a second cadence at καὶ τόκῳ ζῶσα·, and in Iakovos' and Petros' Doxastarion the voice passes the whole tetartos octave within πρέσβευε, before it finishes the kolon by a tetartos cadence (δ') on the phthongos d πα'. Only Konstantinos the Protopsaltes in his Doxastarion argosyntomon follows the ambitus of the old sticherarion, but without any change to the phthora nana. Instead, there is a change to the chromatic genus of the mesos devteros and to the diphonic system, if Konstantinos followed Chrysanthos' concept, which might be regarded as rather unlikely. In any case, his composition is unique in this comparison and an alternative interpretation of the medial signature: the tetartos d δ' as mesos devteros.

==== Transcription of the heirmologic melos ====
The transcriptions of the heirmologion kalophonikon were more lucky than those of the sticherarion kalophonikon. They were not only retranscribed according to the New Method by Gregorios the Protopsaltes, but also published by Theodoros Phokaeos as a printed chant book. The printed collections usually favored 17th-century compositions of Petros Bereketis, Balasios Iereas, and Germanos of New Patras, but also compositions by Panagiotes Halaçoğlu and teachers of the New Music School, especially by Iakovos the Protopsaltes and his students.

The heirmologion kalophonikon usually picked up one ode of the canon and elaborated it in a kalophonic way, but it was divided according to the conventional Octoechos order. A second part (pp. 189-262) was a "Kratematarion of the kalophonic Heirmos" in the Octoechos order as well, which could be used to prolong the performance. Earlier hand-written anthologies usually notated the heirmos kalophonikos together with a certain kratema that had been exclusively composed for it. However, the separated form of the printed edition might also indicate that a kratema could be performed alone.

Concerning the discussion of the heirmologic melos between Petros Peloponnesios, Petros Byzantios, and Iakovos the Protopsaltes, there is a very similar evolution, as it can be found in the definition of the sticheraric melos according to the New Method. Petros Peloponnesios composed a "heirmologion ton katavaseion" which has to be performed in the same tempo, as it had become the "fast sticheraric melos." It is a coincidence between the "melos heirmologikon argon" and the "sticherarikon syntomon", as it also exists between Iakovos' "melos sticherarikon argon" and the "melos papadikes." Petros Peloponnesios' student Petros Byzantios added a simpler version of a "heirmologion syntomon" which followed the same mechanic patterns, as they had been developed by his teacher in his Anastasimatarion syntomon. Today, his version is identified as "the heirmologic melos", but its tempo is the same as the one used for the troparia in the common edition of Anastasimatarion neon.

Iakovos the Protopsaltes refused the rhythmic style of Petros Peloponnesios and his student Petros Byzantios (his colleague and cofounder of the third Music School who created the Heirmologion syntomon), after his teacher had created the Heirmologion argon over the Katavaseion melodies. According to their compositions the tritos echoi and the plagios tetartos were entirely intoned enharmonic according to the phthora nana. Soon after Chrysanthos, the enharmonic intonation of the tetrachord was defined as pythagorean, hence, its genos was classified as "hard diatonic."

So we might have four octoechos cycles according to the New Method, which are in the mind of a psaltes in the current tradition of monodic Orthodox Chant, but in fact the "argon" variant in some chant genres tend to cross to the next slower genre.

=== Innovations ===
It is not enough to reduce the work of several generations at the "New Music School of the Patriarchate" to a more or less selective translation of "Byzantine Chant", based on a certain redaction of Panagiotes the New Chrysaphes and other Protopsaltes of the 17th century who tried to save the inherited tradition. Its loss was already anticipated in 1457 by the Constantinopolitan Lampadarios Manuel Chrysaphes. Since the fall of Constantinople protopsaltes, including the leading protagonists later at the New Music School, were present as the creators of an own tradition in the territory of the Ottoman Empire, as well as in the Boyar Principalities of Wallachia and Moldavia. It was less opposed to the Byzantine tradition, rather gave it fresh impulses which kept it alive. On the other hand, it shared an equal part with other music traditions in a rich and inspiring exchange among musicians of the Ottoman Empire.

So the question is not only how they transcribed the traditional repertory into a more or less modified notation, but also how they used this medium of written transmission for their own compositions within Orthodox chant. During the 17th century, Panagiotes the New Chrysaphes and Germanos of New Patras represent more traditional protopsaltes of the Patriarchate, who cared about the proper understanding of the Byzantine tradition. Meanwhile, others like Petros Bereketis had never been directly associated with the Patriarchate, but their psaltic art became very appreciated because it combined a highly refined knowledge of the traditions with experiments of transition that were inspired by their intimate knowledge of makamlar, which he got thanks to a permanent exchange with other musicians.

Already, Gregorios Bounes Alyates (Γρηγόριος Μπούνης ὁ Ἀλυάτης), Protopsaltes of the Hagia Sophia before and after the conquest of Constantinople, was recognised by the Sultan for the power he gained over other musicians because of his competence in writing down and memorizing chant from other traditions, then adapting them according to the Octoechos style. This thief aspect, as discussed by Petros Peloponnesios' career as "Hirsiz Petros", is also connected to the activities of systematically collecting and transcribing chants from other traditions, as they had been documented since the 18th century. This intensive exchange with the music of the Ottoman Empire, which could be occasions or coffee-houses where musicians met together and exchanged their music by performing it, transcription and memorisation by the medium of Byzantine Octoechos notation, or even music lessons (which several Greek musicians requested and got from traditional composers of the whirling dervishes) also inspired certain compositions that they contributed to the traditional genres of Byzantine chant.

The Chrysanthine notation and the New Method, which were also used in the field of "exoteric music" in makam publications like Pandora, Evterpe, Kaliphonos Seiren, and Apanthisma e Mecmue, and the redefinition of the Byzantine tradition adapted to the common tone system of the tambur frets, had been a great temptation to fill the gaps of the four Octoechos cycles with new melodies and intervals which had been imported from other music traditions of the Levantic community of musicians. Makam compositions were not always identified as makam, and especially related genres, like compositions of the heirmologic melos in kalophonic elaboration, rather defined as papadic melos and sung during the Divine Liturgies, for instance as koinonikon (while the heirmologion was a traditional part of the daily morning service), became the favorite genre for these experiments. The heirmos kalophonikos was made popular by Petros Bereketis during the 17th century, despite the fact that it had already existed since the rise of psaltic art in the last 150 years of the Byzantine Empire.

This genre was also used by composers of the 19th century who wanted to contribute their own compositions to their local tradition. For instance, the Macedonian monk Neofit Rilski was also a chant teacher of the Bulgarian Orthodox Church and used a devteros composition of Petros Bereketis to compose a koinonikon in honor of the patron of the Rila Monastery, Ivan Rilski.

Still, the innovations did not end with the foundation of National Orthodox Schools of chant or with the Phanariotes' interest for the transcription of local traditions, of folk or art music. To this day, every Domestikos or Archon psaltis at the Great Church of the Ecumenical Patriarchate is supposed to create his own realisations, in particular for all genres sung during the Divine Liturgies, their cherouvika, or their leitourgika—the sung dialogue of the Anaphora composed in a certain echos or even in a certain makam as a particular melos of a certain echos.

The flexibility of psaltic art, for instance to sing the traditional model of the cherouvikon in that length as it is required by a certain ceremony, does still exist as a standard, at least for the highest rank of the protopsaltes, as far as they do not engage too much in the common fight between the celebrating priest, deacon, or hieromonachos and the protopsaltes. Still, the majority of psaltes depend on the chant as it has been transcribed in the printed chant books of the New Method.

During his period in charge of an archon protopsaltes, Thrasyvoulos Stanitsas notated an abridged week cycle of the cherouvika according to the papadic melos of the Octoechos, because the usual week cycle, based on compositions by Petros Peloponnesios, Gregorios the Protopsaltes, and Chourmouzios the Archivist, was still long enough that performing psaltes had been interrupted quite often. Thrasyvoulos Stanitsas' cycle allows psaltes to perform the cherouvika in an even shorter time, without abandoning solistic features like a wide ambitus and frequent changes (μεταβολαὶ) of any kind. He soon added another cycle called "argosyntomon", where the same ideas had been formed out in a rather appropriate way, without being as expansive as the teachers of the New Music School used to be in their compositions of the "argon" cycle for festive occasions.

On the other hand, the common attitude of the early 19th century in the long exegesis type called παλαιὸν ("traditional style") has often been perceived as too long, as a kind of ballast, or as an obstacle which lies on the way to an easier and more direct understanding of the Byzantine sources. Byzantinists as editors of the Transcripta serial of Monumenta Musicae Byzantinae had always dreamed of making their sources available to performers. During the last years, it was especially Ioannis Arvanitis, like Lykourgos Angelopoulos once a student of Simon Karas, who made concrete propositions for performers concerning the thesis of the melos of selected examples taken from medieval chant manuscripts. Following his method of doing the thesis, he re-transcribed from the old notation of Petros Peloponnesios' week cycle.

== See also ==
- Protopsaltes (Domestikos, Lampadarios)—ranks of psaltes in charge of the Patriarchate

=== People ===
- Iakovos Nafpliotis—Phanariot and head of the Old Patriarchal School
- Hammamizade İsmail Dede Efendi—composer of the Mevlevi tradition and teacher of Gregorios the Protopsaltes

=== Traditions ===
- Hagiopolitan and Papadic Octoechos
- Byzantine Music—traditional music of the Byzantine Empire
- Jewish music—the Sephardic tradition of the Levante
- Mevlevi Order—whirling dervishes and their Makam tradition
- Music of Greece—various traditions of the mainland and islands of Greece
- Music of Turkey—traditional music since the end of the Ottoman Empire
- Ottoman classical music—all music traditions of the Ottoman Empire

== Sources ==
=== Papadikai ===
- Conomos, Dimitri, ed. (1985), The Treatise of Manuel Chrysaphes, the Lampadarios: [Περὶ τῶν ἐνθεωρουμένων τῇ ψαλτικῇ τέχνῃ καὶ ὧν φρουνοῦσι κακῶς τινες περὶ αὐτῶν] On the Theory of the Art of Chanting and on Certain Erroneous Views that some hold about it (Mount Athos, Iviron Monastery MS 1120, July 1458), Monumenta Musicae Byzantinae - Corpus Scriptorum de Re Musica, vol. 2, Vienna: Verlag der Österreichischen Akademie der Wissenschaften, ISBN 978-3-7001-0732-3.
- Hannick, Christian; Wolfram, Gerda, eds. (1985), Gabriel Hieromonachus: [Περὶ τῶν ἐν τῇ ψαλτικῇ σημαδίων καὶ τῆς τούτων ἐτυμολογίας] Abhandlung über den Kirchengesang, Monumenta Musicae Byzantinae - Corpus Scriptorum de Re Musica, vol. 1, Vienna: Verlag der Österreichischen Akademie der Wissenschaften, ISBN 3-7001-0729-3.

=== Treatises of the New Method (since 19th century) ===
- Chrysanthos of Madytos (1832). Pelopides, Panagiotes G. (ed.). Θεωρητικόν μέγα της μουσικής συνταχθέν μεν παρά Χρυσάνθου αρχιεπισκόπου Διρραχίου του εκ Μαδύτων εκδοθέν δε υπό Παναγιώτου Γ. Πελοπίδου Πελοποννησίου διά φιλοτίμου συνδρομής των ομογενών. Triest: Michele Weis.
- Anastasiou, Spiridon; Keïvelis, Ioannis G. (1856). Απάνθισμα ή Μεδζμουαϊ μακαμάτ περιέχον μεν διάφορα τουρκικά άσματα. Istanbul: Taddaios Tividesian.
- Keltzanides, Panagiotes (1881). Μεθοδική διδασκαλία θεωρητική τὲ καὶ πρακτική πρὸς ἐκμάθησιν καὶ διάδοσιν τοῦ γνησίου ἐξωτερικοῦ μέλους τῆς καθ᾿ ἡμᾶς Ἑλληνικῆς Μουσικῆς κατ᾿ ἀντιπαράθεσιν πρὸς τὴν Ἀραβοπερσικήν. Istanbul: A. Koromela & Sons.
- Ἡ Ἐπιτροπή: Στοιχεώδης Διδασκαλία τῆς Ἐκκλησιαστικῆς Μουσικῆς Ἐκπονηθεῖσα ἐπὶ τῇ βάσει τοῦ Ψαλτηρίου ὑπὸ τῆς Ἐπιτροπῆς τοῦ Οἰκουμενικοῦ Πατριαρχείου ἐν Ἔτει 1883. Istanbul. 1888.
- Kosmas Metropolit of Madyta (1897). Ποιμενικός αυλός περιέχων μουσικά έργα εκδιδόμενα αδεία του Υπουργείου της Δημοσίας Εκπαιδεύσεως υπό ημερομηνίαν 25 Ραμαζάν 313 και 15 Φεβρουαρίου 312 (1897) και υπ΄ αριθμόν 552. Διηρημένα εις τρία τεύχη Κοσμά του εκ Μαδύτων μητροπολίτου Πελαγωνίας. Vol. 1. Athens: Spyridones Kousoulinos.
- Konstantinou, Georgios N. (1997). Θεωρία καί Πράξη τῆς Ἐκκλησιαστικῆς Μουσικῆς. Athens: Nektarios D. Panagopoulos.

== Chant books with octoechos notation ==
=== Middle Byzantine notation (13th–19th century) ===
- "Copenhagen, Det kongelige Bibliotek, Ms. NkS 4960, 4°". Complete Sticherarion with Menaion, Triodion, Pentekostarion, and Octoechos (14th century).
- "Cambridge, Trinity College, Ms. B.11.17". Complete Sticherarion with Menaion, Triodion, Pentekostarion and Oktoechos with Prosomoia of the Athonite Pantokrator Monastery (ca. 1400).
- "GB-Lbl Ms. Add. 39611". Heirmologion (KaO, without echos protos section) written at Saint Catherine's Monastery on Mount Sinai (end of the 17th century). Archived from the original on 2021-12-22.
- Panagiotes the New Chrysaphes. "London, British Library, Harley Ms. 1613". Anthologia with Byzantine composers (Anastasimatarion, Ainoi, Pasapnoaria & Prokeimena, Sticherarion and Leitourgika) (17th century). British Library.
- Panagiotes the New Chrysaphes. "London, British Library, Harley Ms. 5544". Papadike and the Anastasimatarion of Chrysaphes the New, and an incomplete Anthology for the Divine Liturgies (17th century). British Library.
- "Island of Syme, Archeio Demogerontias, Ms. 334". Anthology of the Papadike written by Ioannes Trapezountios in Constantinople (1765).
- "Island of Syme, Archeio Demogerontias, Ms. 335". Anthology of the Papadike written by Ioannes Trapezountios in Constantinople (1765).
- Glykys, Ioannes; Kladas, Ioannes; Korones, Xenos; Ethikos, Nikephoros; Ioannes the Lampadarios. "Island of Syme, Archeio Demogerontias, Ms. 336". Kratematarion in oktoechos order (1767).
- "London, British Library, Add MS 19456". Papadike and Anthologia (Anoixontarion, Anastasimatarion, Polyeleoi, and Leitourgika) (18th century). British Library. Archived from the original on 27 March 2021.
- Panagiotes the New Chrysaphes. "Bucarest, Stavropoleos Monastery, Ms. 47 m". Triodion, Holy Week, and Pentecostarion of the Sticherarion (18th century). Stavropoleos Monastery.
- Petros Peloponnesios. "London, British Library, Ms. Add. 16971". Katavasiai (Heirmologion argon), Prosomoia, and an incomplete Anthology for the Divine Liturgies (18th century). British Library. Archived from the original on 2021-03-27.
- Petros Peloponnesios; Petros Byzantios. "London, British Library, Ms. Add. 17718". Anastasimatarion and Doxastarion (about 1800). British Library. Archived from the original on 2022-06-18.
- Petros Peloponnesios (1775). "Bucarest, Stavropoleos Monastery, Gr. Ms. F 48m". Doxastarion syntomon (Menaion, Triodion and Pentekostarion) copied by Athanasios Photeinos. Stavropoleos Monastery.
- Georgios of Crete (1790s). "Δοξαστάριο Ιακώβου Πρωτοψάλτου (πρωτότυπο, παλαιά γραφή)". Kozan: Κοβεντάρειος Δημοτική Βιβλιοθήκη.

=== Chrysanthine notation (since 1814) ===
- "Argostoli, Corgialenios Library, Collection Michael Raze, Ms. 87". Sticherarion of Panagiotes the New Chrysaphes (1820).
- Petros Peloponnesios (c. 1818). Gregorios the Protopsaltes (transcription) (ed.). "Αναστασιματάριον σύντομον κατά το ύφος της μεγάλης εκκλησίας μελοποιηθέν παρά κυρ Πέτρου Λαμπαδαρίου του Πελοποννησίου· εξηγηθέν κατά τον νέον της μουσικής τρόπον παρά Γρηγορίου Πρωτοψάλτου". Naoussa, Pontian's National Library of Argyroupolis 'Kyriakides', Ms. Sigalas 52. Naoussa: Aristotle University of Thessaloniki.
- Ephesios, Petros Manuel, ed. (1820). Νέον Αναστασιματάριον μεταφρασθέν κατά την καινοφανή μέθοδον της μουσικής υπό των εν Κωνσταντινουπόλει μουσικολογιωτάτων Διδασκάλων και εφευρετών του νέου μουσικού συστήματος. Bucharest.
- Petros Peloponnesios the Lampadarios (1820). Ephesios, Petros Manuel (ed.). Σύντομον δοξαστάριον του αοιδίμου Πέτρου Λαμπαδαρίου του Πελοποννησίουν: Μεταφρασθέν κατά την νέαν μέθοδον της Μουσικής των Μουσικολογιωτάτων Διδασκάλων του νέου Συστήματος. Bucharest.
- Petros Peloponnesios the Lampadarios; Petros Byzantios (1825). Chourmouzios Chartophylakos (ed.). Ειρμολόγιον των καταβασιών Πέτρου του Πελοποννησίου μετά του συντόμου Ειρμολογίου Πέτρου Πρωτοψάλτου του Βυζαντίου: Εξηγημένα κατά την νέαν της μουσικής μέθοδον μετά προσθήκης ικανών μαθημάτων, ων εστερούντο εις το παλαιόν. Επιθεωρηθέντα ήδη, και ακριβώς διορθωθέντα παρά του Διδασκάλου Χουρμουζίου Χαρτοφύλακος. Istanbul: Isaac De Castro.
- Petros Peloponnesios the Lampadarios; Chourmouzios Chartophylakos (1832). Theodoros Phokaeos (ed.). Αναστασιματάριον νέον μεταφρασθέντα εις το νέον της μουσικής σύστημα παρά του διδασκάλου Χουρμουζίου Χαρτοφύλακος, και του κυρίου Θεοδώρου Φωκέως. Περιέχον τα Αναστάσιμα του Εσπερινού, Όρθρου, και Λειτουργίας, μετά των αναστασίμων Κανόνων, Μαρτυρικών, και Νεκρωσίμων της Μεγάλης Τεσσαρακοστής, των τε Εωθινών, και των συντόνων Τιμιωτέρων. Τα πάντα καθώς την σήμερον ψάλλονται εις το Πατριαρχείον μεταφρασθέντα εις το νέον της μουσικής σύστημα παρά του διδασκάλου Χουρμουζίου Χαρτοφύλακος, και του κυρίου Θεοδώρου Φωκέως. Istanbul: Isaac De Castro.
- Gregorios the Protopsaltes (1835). Theodoros Phokaeos (ed.). Ειρμολόγιον καλοφωνικόν: Μελοποιηθέν παρά διαφόρων ποιητών παλαιών τε και νέων διδασκάλων μεταφρασθέν δε εις την νέαν της μουσικής μέθοδον Και μετά πάσης Επιμελείας διορθωθέν παρά του ενός των τριών Διδασκάλων της ρηθείσης Μεθόδου Γρηγορίου Πρωτοψάλτου της του Χριστού Μεγάλης Εκκλησίας. Νυν πρώτον εκδοθέν εις τύπον παρά Θεοδώρου Π. Παράσκου Φωκέως. Επιστασία του αυτού, Αναλώμασι δε του τε ιδίου Και των Φιλομούσων Συνδρομητών. Istanbul: Isaac De Castro.
- Iakovos the Protopsaltes (1836). Chourmouzios Chartophylakos (ed.). Δοξαστάριον περιέχον τα δοξαστικά όλων των δεσποτικών, και θεομητορικών εορτών, των τε εορταζομένων αγίων του όλου ενιαυτού, του τε Τριωδίου και Πεντηκοσταρίου, μελοποιηθέν παρά Ιακώβου Πρωτοψάλτου της του Χριστού Μεγάλης Εκκλησίας. Εξηγηθέν απαραλλάκτως εις την Νέαν της Μουσικής Μέθοδον παρά Χουρμουζίου Χαρτοφύλακος. Vol. 1–2. Istanbul: Isaac De Castro.
- Konstantinos the Protopsaltes (1841). Stephanos the Domestikos (ed.). Δοξαστάριον περιέχον τα δοξαστικά όλων των δεσποτικών και θεομητορικών εορτών των τε εορταζομένων αγίων του όλου ενιαυτού του τε Τριωδίου και Πεντηκοσταρίου μελοποιηθέν παρά Κωνσταντίνου Πρωτοψάλτου της του Χριστού Μεγάλης Εκκλησίας. Εξηγηθέν απαραλλάκτως εις την Νέαν της Μουσικής Μέθοδον παρά πρώτου Δομεστίχου Στεφάνου. Vol. 1–2. Istanbul: Patriarchate.
- Petros Peloponnesios the Lampadarios (1899). Biolakis, Georgios; Klavvas, Konstantinos; Nafpliotis, Iakovos (eds.). Το Δοξαστάριον Πέτρου Πελοποννησίου; εξηγηθέν πιστώς εκ της αρχαίας εις την καθ' ημάς γραφήν υπό του Πρωτοψάλτου της Μεγάλης του Χριστού Εκκλησίας Γεωργίου Βιολάκη. Vol. 1–2. Istanbul: Publisher of the Patriarchate.
- Petros Peloponnesios; Ioannes the Protopsaltes (1905). Αναστασιματάριον νέον άργον και σύντομον μετά προσθηκής των στίχων, κανώνων, καταβασίων και τινών αλλών αναγκαίων. Istanbul: Publisher of the Patriarchate.
- Sarafov, Petĕr V. (1912). Rĕkovodstvo za praktičeskoto i teoretičesko izučvane na Vostočnata cĕrkovna muzika, Parachodni uroci, Voskresnik i Antologija (Polielei, Božestvena služba ot Ioana Zlatoousta, Božestvena služba na Vasilij Velikij, Prazdnični pričastni za prĕz cĕlata godina, Sladkoglasni Irmosi). Sofia: Peter Gluškov.

== Studies ==
- Alexandru, Maria (2000). Studie über die 'großen Zeichen' der byzantinischen musikalischen Notation unter besonderer Berücksichtigung der Periode vom Ende des 12. bis Anfang des 19. Jahrhunderts. Universität Kopenhagen.
- Amargianakis, George (1977). An Analysis of Stichera in the Deuteros Modes: The Stichera idiomela for the Month of September in the Modes Deuteros, Plagal Deuteros, and Nenano; transcribed from the Manuscript Sinai 1230 <A.D. 1365>. Cahiers de l'Institut du Moyen-Âge Grec et Latin. Vol. 22–23. Copenhague: Univ.
- Arvanitis, Ioannis (2010). "Ο ρυθμός των εκκλησιαστικών μελών μέσα από τη παλαιογραφική έρευνα και την εξήγηση της παλαιάς σημειογραφίας [The rhythm of the ecclesiastic chants through the paleographic research and the transcription of the old notation]". Corfu: Ionian University. doi:10.12681/eadd/21885. hdl:10442/hedi/21885.
- Arvanitis, Ioannis (1997). Troelsgård, Christian (ed.). "A Way to the Transcription of Old Byzantine Chant by means of Written and Oral Tradition". Byzantine Chant: Tradition and Reform — Acts of a Meeting Held at the Danish Institute at Athens, 1993. Monographs of the Danish Institute at Athens. 4. Aarhus: Aarhus University Press: 123–141.
- Brandl, Rudolf Maria (1989). Elsner, Jürgen (ed.). "Konstantinopolitanische Makamen des 19. Jahrhunderts in Neumen: die Musik der Fanarioten". Maqam - Raga - Zeilenmelodik: Konzeptionen und Prinzipien der Musikproduktion. 1. Arbeitstagung der Study Group "maqām" beim International Council for Traditional Music vom 28. Juni bis 2. Juli 1988 in Berlin. Berlin: 156–169.
- Erol, Merıh (25 May 2008). "'External' music in Constantinople". Encyclopaedia of the Hellenic World, Constantinople.
- Gerlach, Oliver (2009). Im Labyrinth des Oktōīchos – Über die Rekonstruktion mittelalterlicher Improvisationspraktiken in liturgischer Musik. Vol. 2. Berlin: Ison. ISBN 9783000323065.
- Gerlach, Oliver (2011). "Religious Chant in the late Ottoman Empire – Between Petros Bereketēs and Hamamîzade İsmail Dede Efendi". Studies of the Dark Continent in European Music History: Collected Essays on Traditions of Religious Chant in the Balkans. Rome: Aracne. pp. 81–110. ISBN 9788854838406.
- Gheorghiţă, Nicolae (2010). "Secular Music at the Romanian Princely Courts during the Phanariot Epoch (1711-1821)". Byzantine Chant between Constantinopole and the Danubian Principalities: Studies in Byzantine Musicology. Bucharest: Sophia. ISBN 978-973-136-227-4.
- Hannick, Christian, ed. (1991). Rhythm in Byzantine Chant – Acta of the Congress held at Hernen Castle in November 1986. Hernen: Bredius Foundation.
- Husmann, Heinrich (1970). "Die oktomodalen Stichera und die Entwicklung des byzantinischen Oktoëchos". Archiv für Musikwissenschaft. 27 (4): 304–325. doi:10.2307/930047. JSTOR 930047.
- Joubran, Romanos Rabih (2009). "The Use of Eastern Musical Modes in Byzantine Compositions during the 19th and 20th Century" (PDF). Proceedings of the 1st International Conference of the ASBMH. 1st International Conference of the ASBMH, 2007: Byzantine Musical Culture. Pittsburgh. pp. 530–553.
- Kalaitzidis, Kyriakos (2012). Post-Byzantine music manuscripts as a source for Oriental secular music (15th to early 19th century). Istanbuler Texte und Studien. Vol. 28. Kyriaki Koubaroulis, Dimitri Koubaroulis (trans.). Würzburg: Ergon. ISBN 978-3-89913-947-1.
- Makris, Eustathios (2005). "The Chromatic Scales of the Deuteros Modes in Theory and Practice". Plainsong and Medieval Music. 14: 1–10. doi:10.1017/S0961137104000075. ISSN 0961-1371. S2CID 162385479.
- Neubauer, Eckhard (1998), "Die acht "Wege" der arabischen Musiklehre und der Oktoechos – Ibn Misğah, al-Kindī und der syrisch-byzantinische oktōēchos", Arabische Musiktheorie von den Anfängen bis zum 6./12. Jahrhundert: Studien, Übersetzungen und Texte in Faksimile, Publications of the Institute for the History of Arabic-Islamic Science: The science of music in Islam, vol. 3, Frankfurt am Main: Inst. for the History of Arab.-Islamic Science, pp. 373–414.
- Papadopoulos, Georgios (1904). Ιστορική επισκόπησις της βυζαντινής εκκλησιαστικής μουσικής από των αποστολικών χρόνων μέχρι των καθ΄ ημάς (1-1900 μ.Χ.). Athens: Typois Praxitelous.
- Popescu-Judeţ, Eugenia; Şırlı, Adriana Ababi (2000). Sources of 18th-century music : Panayiotes Chalathzoglou and Kyrillos Marmarinos' comparative treatises on secular music. Istanbul: Pan Yayıncılık. ISBN 975-843405-5.
- Raasted, Jørgen (1966). Intonation Formulas and Modal Signatures in Byzantine Musical Manuscripts. Monumenta Musicae Byzantinae, Subsidia. Vol. 7. Copenhagen: E. Munksgaard.
- Raasted, Jørgen (1995). Szendrej, Janka; Hiley, David (eds.). "Koukouzeles' Revision of the Sticherarion and Sinai gr. 1230". Laborare fratres in unum: Festschrift in honor of László Dobszay's 60th birthday. Spolia Berolinensi. 7. Hildesheim, Zurich: Weidmann: 261–277. ISBN 3615001710.
- Terzopoulos, Konstantinos (2003). 'Poikilia terpousa': A Detailed Study of Konstantinos Byzantios' Sticheraric Melic Compositions. Second Pan-Hellenic Conference on the Psaltic Art (Athens: 15–19 October 2003). Athens. Archived from the original on 1 July 2014.
- Troelsgård, Christian (2011). Byzantine neumes: A New Introduction to the Middle Byzantine Musical Notation. Monumenta musicae byzantinae, Subsidia. Vol. 9. Copenhagen: Museum Tusculanum Press. ISBN 978-87-635-3158-0.
- Troelsgård, Christian. "Psalm, § III Byzantine Psalmody". Grove Music Online. Oxford Music Online.
- Zannos, Ioannis (1994). Vogel, Martin (ed.). Ichos und Makam - Vergleichende Untersuchungen zum Tonsystem der griechisch-orthodoxen Kirchenmusik und der türkischen Kunstmusik. Orpheus-Schriftenreihe zu Grundfragen der Musik. Vol. 74. Bonn: Verlag für systematische Musikwissenschaft. ISBN 9783922626749.
