= Chourmouzios the Archivist =

Ottoman Greek musician

- Χουρμούζιος ὁ Χαρτοφύλαξ
- Born: Chourmouzios Georgiou c. 1770; Halki, Propontis, Ottoman Empire
- Died: 1840; Halki, Propontis, Ottoman Empire
- Other name: the Chalkenteros
- Occupations: secretary, music teacher

Chartophylax of Greek Orthodox Church
- In office c. 1820 – 1840

Chourmouzios the Archivist or Chourmouzios Chartophylax (Greek: Χουρμούζιος ὁ Χαρτοφύλαξ, "Chourmoúzios the Chartophýlax"), also known with the nickname "the Chalkenteros" (Χαλκέντερος, "he with a copper intestine"), born Chourmouzios Georgiou (Χουρμούζιος Γεωργίου; Halki, c. 1770 – Halki, 1840) was an Ottoman Greek composer, musician, music teacher and secretary of the Ottoman Empire.

== Early life ==
Chourmouzios was the son of Georgios and was born in Halki, an island in Propontis, and due to a meaty protuberance on the head, they called him "Yamalis" (Turkish: yamali, "patched"). He was a student of the Byzantine music famous cantors and music teachers Iakovos Protopsaltes and Georgios of Crete.

== Career ==
Chourmouzios served for 40 years as a lead cantor in Saint Demetrius of Tatavla, in Saint John of Galata, in the Sinaitic Metochion of Valatas and again in Saint Demetrius church. He taught at the Music Patriarchal School, throughout its operation (1815–1821). He was one of the creators of musical notation of the New Method, along with Gregorios Protopsaltes and Chrysanthos of Madytos; he also transcribed most of the Ecclesiastical Music to the New Method and was awarded for his work with 10,000 grosi and the title of Chartophylax (Archivist) of the Great Church.

== Works ==
With 18 years of hard labour, Chourmouzios explained all the melodies of the ancient composers, from Saint John of Damascus until Manuel Protopsaltes. These consisted of 70 volumes, which were bought in 1838 by Patriarch Athanasius of Jerusalem, and were looked after by Cyril II, archpriest of the Sion Church. He reduced them into fewer volumes and ordered that they be bound and kept in the library of the Holy Sepulchre in Phanar, where they are currently present.

He edited as long as he lived the publication of his following works:

Year	Title	Original title	Source
1824	Anthology of Music	Ταμείον Ανθολογίας	
1825	Heirmologion of the Katavasias of Petros Peloponnesios	Ειρμολόγιον των Καταβασιών Πέτρου του Πελοποννησίου	
1830	Efterpe, Anthology of Music of chanende Zacharias	Ευτέρπη, ήτοι Ανθολογία εξωτερικής μουσικής του Ζαχαρία	
1831	The collection of Idiomela of Manuel Protopsaltes	Συλλογή ιδιομέλων και απολυτικίων Μανουήλ του Πρωτοψάλτου	
1832	Second edition of the Anastasimatarion	Νέον Αναστασηματάριον	

In the National Library of Greece there are 34 of his manuscripts (codices and volumes).

== Sources ==
- Ecclesiastical Patriarchy (1982). "Chourmouzios the Archivist". Cultura.
- Papadopoulos, Georgios (1904). Historical Overview of Byzantine Church Music (1–1900 A.D.) (in Greek). Athens: Praxiteles. pp. 132–134.
- Aristocles, Theodoros (1866). "Demetrios Paspallis". Biography of Patriarch Constantine I (in Greek). Constantinople: Proodos. pp. 61–63.
