= Panagiotes the New Chrysaphes =

Greek composer and cantor (c. 1622–1862)

Panagiotes the Protopsaltes or Panagiotes the New Chrysaphes (Greek: Παναγιώτης Χρυσάφης ὁ Νέος; c. 1620–25 – after 1682) was a Greek composer, protopsaltes (first cantor) and poet in Constantinople, the capital of the Ottoman Empire.

== Life and work ==
He served as protopsaltes of the Ecumenical Patriarchate of Constantinople (about 1655 to 1682) and like the former protopsaltes Theophanes Karykes he became engaged in a revival of the Byzantine psaltic art or art of chant. As student of the patriarchal protopsaltes Georgios Raidestinos, his approach was based on the recomposition of the late medieval sticherarion as it was described by Manuel Chrysaphes in his treatise about psaltic art, and the recomposition of the Byzantine Anastasimatarion was based on the simple psalmody according to the Octoechos. Several manuscripts of the latter have survived since the 17th century and they were usually introduced by a Papadike treatise, the basic introduction (protheoria) into psaltic art. For these works he was called "the New Chrysaphes".
