= Chrysanthos of Madytos =

Greek poet, chanter, Archimandrite, and Archbishop

Chrysanthos of Madytos (Greek: Χρύσανθος ὁ ἐκ Μαδύτων; (Note: Alternatively ἐκ Μαδύτου.) c. 1770 – 1846) was a Greek poet, chanter, Archimandrite, and Archbishop, born in Madytos. In preparation of the first printed books of Orthodox chant, he was responsible for a reform of the Byzantine notation within the New Music School of the Patriarchate, along with Gregorios the Protopsaltes and Chourmouzios the Archivist who transcribed the traditional repertory into the Chrysanthine notation.

== Works ==
- Petros Peloponnesios (1811). Chrysanthos of Madytos (ed.). Καταβασίαι των δεσποτικών και θεομητορικών εορτών συντεθείσα (sic) μέν παρά του μουσικολογιωτάτου κυρού Πέτρου λαμπαδαρίου του Λακεδαίμονος τω δέ ,αωια΄ υπό Χρυσάνθου τα χρονικά μέτρα διαιρεθείσαι, της κοιμήσεως της Θεοτόκου, ήχος α΄ Πεποικιλμένη τη θεία δόξη.
- Chrysanthos of Madytos (1821). Εισαγωγή εις το θεωρητικόν και πρακτικόν της Εκκλησιαστικής Μουσικής συνταχθείσα προς χρήσιν των σπουδαζόντων αυτήν κατά την νέαν μέθοδον παρά Χρυσάνθου του εκ Μαδύτων, Διδασκάλου του Θεωρητικού της Μουσικής. Paris: Rigniou.
- Chrysanthos of Madytos (1832), Θεωρητικὸν μεγὰ τῆς Μουσικῆς, Triest: Michele Weis.

=== Publications made in his name ===
- Theodoros Phokaeos (1851). Drovianites, Margaritas P. Ch. (ed.). Θεωρητική και πρακτική εκκλησιαστική μουσική. Συνταχθείσα κατά μεν το πρώτον παρά του αοιδίμου Διδασκάλου Χρυσάνθου ενός των τριών της νέας Μεθόδου εφευρετών΄ αντιγραφείσα δε το δεύτερον και τρίτον παρά των άλλων δύο, Γρηγορίου Πρωτοψάλτου της Μεγάλης Εκκλησίας, και Χουρμουζίου Χαρτοφύλακος επί το συντομότερον ωσαύτως και τέταρτον παρά Θεοδώρου Φωκαέως, και διαφόροις τύποις εκδοθείσα. Ήδη δε το πέμπτον και αύθις συνταχθείσα, και όσον οιόν τε επί το μεθοδικώτερον και εξηγηματικώτερον μετενεχθείσα παρά του εκδότου Μαργαρίτου Π. Χ. Δροβιανίτου προς χρήσιν των μαθηματευόντων, νυν πρώτον τύποις εκδέδοται. Galata: E. Kayol.
- Chrysanthos of Madytos; Gregorios the Protopsaltes; Chourmouzios Chartophylakos (1872). Menas, Domenikos (ed.). Κρηπίς του θεωρητικού και πρακτικού της εκκλησιαστικής μουσικής συνταχθείσα παρά Χρυσάνθου Μητροπολίτου Προύσης, Γρηγορίου Πρωτοψάλτου και Χουρμουζίου Χαρτοφύλακος. Athens: Ch. N. Philadelpheos.

=== Translations ===
- Romanou, Katy G. (2010). Great Theory of Music by Chrysanthos of Madytos translated by Katy Romanou. New Rochelle, New York: Axion Estin Foundation. ISBN 9780615342597.
- Terzopulos, Konstantinos (2012). Introduction to the New Method of Byzantine Chant Notation – An English translation of Chourmouzios' revision of Chrysanthos' Eisagoge. Saint Louis, MO: Psaltic Notes Press.

== See also ==
- Neobyzantine Octoechos—Byzantine music
- Ottoman classical music

== Sources ==
- Conomos, Dimitri. "Chrysanthos of Madytos". Grove Music Online.
- Romanou, Katy G. (1990). "A New Approach to the Work of Chrysanthos of Madytos: The New Method of Musical Notation in Greek Church and the Μέγα Θεωρητικόν της Μουσικής". Studies in Eastern Chant. 5: 89–100. ISBN 9780913836798.
- Tentes, Agamemnon (2008). Concept of music by Chrysanthos from Madytos (Ph.D.). Copenhagen: Det Humanistiske Fakultet, Københavs Universitet.
