= Manuel Chrysaphes =

Manuel Doukas Chrysaphes (Greek: Μανουὴλ Δούκας Χρυσάφης, fl. 1440–1470) was the most prominent Byzantine musician of the 15th century.

== Life and works ==
A singer, composer, and musical theoretician, Manuel Chrysaphes was called "the New Koukouzeles" by his admirer, the Cretan composer John Plousiadinos. He is the author of at least 300 compositions, including nearly full modal cycles of liturgical ordinaries (alleluiaria, cheroubika, and koinonika), kalophonic stichera for various movable and fixed feasts throughout the year, kratemata (wordless compositions), and both simple and kalophonic psalmody for Vespers and Matins.

Little is known of his life, except that he held the office of lampadarios at the Constantinopolitan Court, and received commissions from the last two Byzantine emperors, John VIII Palaiologos and Constantine XI Palaiologos. Two of his own autographs survive, one from July 1458 in the Iviron Monastery in Mount Athos, and one from July 1463 in the Topkapi Palace collection. He is also one of the few Byzantine musicians to write on theoretical issues. His surviving treatise, On the Theory of the Art of Chanting and On Certain Erroneous Views That Some Hold about It, is an invaluable guide to Byzantine music and the evolution of Byzantine singing in the late Palaiologan period.

== See also ==
- Chrysaphes the Younger
- John Kukuzelis
