= Petros Peloponnesios =

Petros Peloponnesios ("Peter the Peloponnesian") or Peter the Lampadarios (c. 1735 – 1778) was a cantor, composer and teacher of Byzantine and Ottoman music. He served as second domestikos between his arrival about 1764 until the death of Ioannes Trapezountios, and it is assumed that he became lampadarios (leader of the left choir) between 1770 and 1778 at the Great Church of Constantinople, after Daniel the Protopsaltes became Archon Protopsaltes. Large parts of the monodic chant sung in several current traditions of Orthodox Chant are transcriptions of his compositions. He wrote these as a teacher of the "New Music School of the Patriarchate".

== Life ==
Petros was born at Tripolis, Rumelia Eyalet between 1730 and 1740. According to Georgios Papadopoulos he was educated in monastic communities of Smyrna. In 1764 he came to Constantinople to study with Ioannes Trapezountios, the Archon Protopsaltes, while Daniel like Ioannes student of Panagiotes Halacoğlu was Lampadarios at the Great Church of Constantinople. Petros could serve there as second domestikos who was usually in charge to notate the versions sung by the cantors with the higher ranks. Between 1770 and 1778 he served as lampadarios (leader of the left choir), until he became ill.

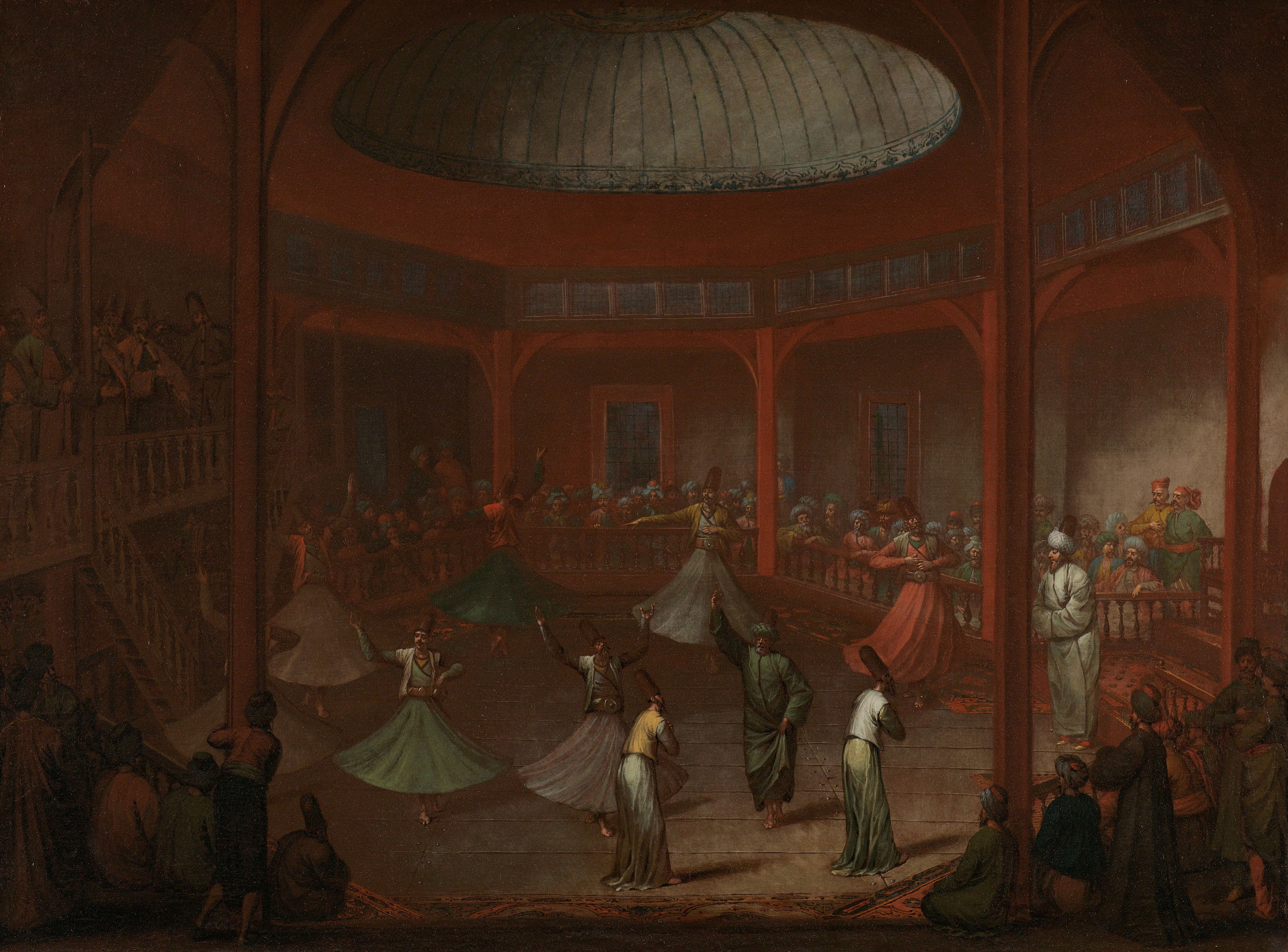
Jean Baptiste Vanmour: Whirling dervishes in the Tekke of Peran (18th-century painting in the collection of the Rijksmuseum)

Together with Iakovos the Protopsaltes, the first domestikos between 1764 and 1776, he followed the first Archon Protopsaltes Daniel as official teacher of the New Music School of the Patriarchate in 1776. He also taught Petros Byzantios he chose as second domestikos after being announced as lampadarios, and composed many exercises (mathemata) for his students. The term "mathemata" usually referred to the kalophonic way to embellish the old stichera (sticheron kalophonikon, anagrammatismos), the old heirmoi (heirmos kalophonikos), certain theotokia or kontakia. Its method was usually taught by John Koukouzeles' «Mega Ison».

Within other musical traditions of the Ottoman Empire, Petros had a very exceptional knowledge of makamlar, probably even of Armenian chant, and even if he did not invent the new analytical way to use Middle Byzantine notation, he had the reputation to have a very profound understanding of music which enabled him to notate music after just have listened to it once, even music which was not composed according to the octoechos. He also had the reputation of being a rather intrigant musician. On the one hand, Hafiz invited him and were very eager to learn even makam melodies from him (probably rather a Greek way of developing them), on the other hand, he was called "Hırsız" (thief) and "Hoca Petros" (teacher), because he had many students coming from a different traditional background. Since he could easily memorise compositions and he liked to change them and perform them in such a convincing way, that some musicians asked for his "permission", before they published them. Petros was also strongly associated with the Mevlevi tekke in Peran. But he was not the first Archon Protopsaltes of the Great Church who had an interest in makam music documented by neume transcriptions of makam music, already Panagiotes Halacoğlu who preceded Ioannes as Archon Protopsaltes (ca. 1726–1736), had it. Halacoğlu's student Kyrillos Marmarinos transcribed makamlar into Byzantine neumes and both wrote treatises about it. Petros was in his forties, when he died during a plague in Constantinople which killed a third of its population.

== Petros' contribution to church and makam music ==
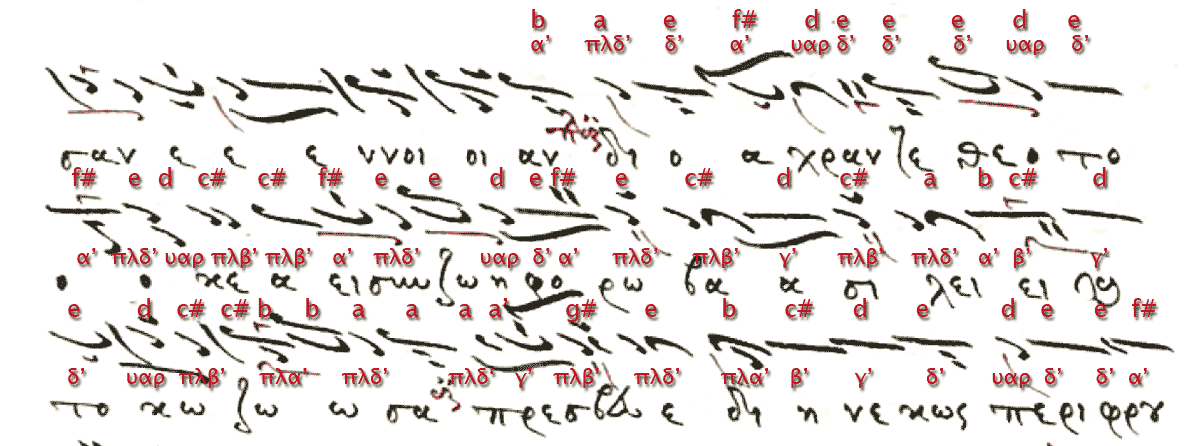
Petros Peloponnesios' realisation of the Doxastikon oktaechon Θεαρχίῳ νεύματι (Dormition of the Theotokos, 15 August), eighth section of echos plagios tetartos (C—c transposed on the phthongos κε=a) in a copy of his «Doxastarion syntomon» by Anastasios Proikonesios (GB-Bm, Ms. Gr. 7, fol. 70v)

His reputation―as an important teacher and composer―is mainly based on his vast contributions concerning the Heirmologion (Katavaseion or Heirmologion argon, printed the first time in transcription in 1825) and the short or simple Sticherarion (Doxastarion syntomon, printed the first time in transcription in 1820). These innovations of Orthodox chant had been written during his last years and parts of it were likely continued by his second domestikos Petros Byzantios who followed him as lampadarios, but also as teacher at the New Music School of the Patriarchate. According to Chrysanthos, Petros Peloponnesios' realisations for the Anthology of the Divine Liturgies (like the Papadic cherubikon, and koinonikon cycles) were already written, while he was still second domestikos and not supposed to contribute with own compositions. Petros composed two cycles of cherubika for the weekdays, unlike other composers who composed in all eight echoi, his cycles follow the order of the weekly koinonika (protos for Monday, varys for Tuesday, tetartos for Wednesday, plagios tetartos for Thursday, and plagios protos for Friday). Later as lampadarios, Petros did not simply transcribe and contribute to the new hyphos created by his masters Ioannes and Daniel, he also studied the Byzantine tradition as well as innovative Protopsaltes of the Ottoman period like Petros Bereketis. Although it is not clear, whether Georgios Papadopoulos was right that Petros stole makam music, since the author rather compiled earlier Ottoman anecdotes in his biography of Petros, the latter had a certain reputation to usurp the contribution to the hyphos by other composers like Ioannes the Protopsaltes and Daniel the Protopsaltes as his own work, especially of those he was charged to transcribe as a second domestikos. Sometimes he simply pointed at the hyphos project he shared with Daniel the Protopsaltes and other students of Ioannes. He did not write down the background of a traditional melos as was the traditional synoptic use of notation, but also details of a personal realisation like in case of the doxastikon of Kassia's troparion, which he specified "in imitation of Daniel the Protopsaltes".

Petros Peloponnesios' abridged Doxastarion was one of the first transcriptions of idiomela according to a new simple "hyphos"-style which was created by Ioannes Trapezountios. The necessity for such an abridgement followed a request by Patriarch Cyril V in 1756, after the melos of the old sticherarion in the tradition of 17th-century composers like Georgios Raidestinos, Panagiotes the New Chrysaphes, and Germanos of New Patras had become too elaborated. Petros' Doxastarion and its rhythmic style was very controversially discussed among the other teachers at the New Music School of the Patriarchate, especially by Petros' rival Iakovos. The dispute was followed by alternative editions, and the hyphos was continued as an oral tradition among traditionalist protopsaltes like Konstantinos Byzantios, Georgios Raidestinos II, Iakovos Nafpliotes, and Konstantinos Pringos.

Petros' reputation was not limited to the field of Orthodox chant, he also "composed" and transcribed other genres of Armenian and Ottoman (even composers of the 14th century), including Ottoman makam genres like Peşrev, Taksim and Saz semai which were usually included in cyclic compositions known as Fasıl, but also makam compositions following usul rhythms over Greek texts (Tragodia rhomaïka). According to Kyriakos Kalaitzidis between three and five manuscripts with Makam transcriptions written by Petros' hand have survived, where Petros did also suggest their cyclic organisation as Fasıl. With the Codex Gritsanis 3, Petros created one of the most important collections of classical Ottoman music between the 14th and the 18th centuries.

== Works ==
The following list refers to the common ascription of the largest repertoire of monodic Orthodox chant to Petros, except the Anastasimatarion syntomon, ascribed to Petros by Chrysanthos and contemporary scribes, but nowadays regarded as a contribution by Daniel the Protopsaltes. Concerning the Koinonikon cycle, some Anthologies present two different cycles, one of them is supposed to be composed by Petros. The ascription of such a big part to Petros is still a controversial issue, even if his contribution can hardly be underestimated. He obviously had a key role as a notator of the Ecumenical Patriarchate, but this became the charge of the Second Domestikos who had to transcribe the first realisations of the hyphos as it was performed by the first domestikos, the lampadarios, and the archon protopsaltes.

=== Books ===
- Anastasimatarion neon (sticheraric kekragaria and troparia)
- Heirmologion argon of the Katavasies (slow heirmologic melos of the hyphos)
- Doxastarion syntomon (Doxastika idiomela of the Menaion, the Triodion, and the Pentekostarion in the new fast sticheraric melos)
- All compositions by Petros Bereketis

=== Hesperinos ===
- Traditional realisation of the hymn «φῶς ἱλαρὸν» (echos devteros)
- Kekragaria syntoma (sticheraric melos, abridged version of the Kekragaria published in the Anastasimatarion)
- Kekragaria (see Anastasimatarion neon) and Anoixantaria in the sticheraric syntomon melos
- Makarios aner (echos plagios tetartos)
- The great evening Prokeimena for Saturdays of the Lenten Period
- Idiomela aposticha (fast and slow sticheraric melos) for Saturdays of the Lenten Period
- Apolytikia katanyktika for Saturdays of the Lenten Period

=== Mesonyktikon and Orthros ===
- Triadika troparia «Άξιον εστίν»
- Evlogetaria in the slow heirmologic melos (echos plagios protos, base κε)
- Evlogetaria in the slow heirmologic melos (echos plagios protos, base δι)
- Polyeleos despotikos «Δούλοι Κύριον» (echos plagios protos)
- Polyeleos despotikos «Λόγον Αγαθόν» (diatonic echos varys)
- Polyeleos «Βαβυλώνος Αλληλούϊα» (echos plagios tetartos)
- 3 Pasapnoaria heothina (echos plagios tetartos, two in echos plagios devteros)
- Psalm 50 (fast melos, echos devteros)
- Pentekostaria of Psalm 50 in the slow melos of echos devteros
- Pentekostaria of the Triodion
- Megalynaria timiotera in the fast melos (eight echoi)
- Megalynaria timiotera in the slow melos (eight echoi)
- Fast Doxologiai (eight echoi)
- Slow Doxologiai (echos protos, legetos, tritos and tetartos, plagios devteros)
- First Antiphonon (slow melos, echos tetartos)
- Anavathmoi (slow melos, echos plagios protos)

=== Great Compline (Lenten period) ===
- Heirmos «Την πάσαν ελπίδα μου» (echos devteros)
- Kontakion «Ψυχή μου,ψυχή μου» (echos plagios devteros)
- Heirmos «Ασπόρου συλλήψεως» (echos devteros)
- Troparion «Πάντων προστατεύεις» (echos devteros)
- Sticheron prosomoion «Σφαγήν σου την άδικον» (echos protos)

=== Triodion of the Doxastarion argon ===
- Doxastikon apostichon over the Troparion of Holy Wednesday by Kassia «Κύριε, ἡ ἐν πολλαῖς ἁμαρτίαις» in the style of Daniel the Protopsaltes (slow sticheraric melos, echos plagios tetartos)
- Doxastikon apostichon «Κύριε αναβαίνοντός σου» (echos plagios tetartos)
- Doxastikon apostichon for Hesperinos of Good Friday «Σε τον αναβαλλόμενον το φώς» (echos plagios protos)

=== Divine Liturgy ===
- Resurrection hymn «Χριστός ανέστη» (slow sticheraric melos, echos plagios protos)
- Typika (Antiphonon 1 in echos plagios tetartos, Antiphonon 2 in echos devteros)
- Makarismoi (echos devteros)
- Eisodika «Δεύτε προσκυνήσωμεν» «Εκ γαστρός» (echos devteros)
- Fast and slow Trisagion (echos devteros) with short Dynamis
- Antitrisagion «Οσοι εις Χριστόν» (echos protos) with short Dynamis
- Fast Antitrisagion «Τον Σταυρόν σου» (echos devteros) with short Dynamis
- Processional Mele «Κύριε σώσον»
- Paracletic «Κύριε ελέησον»
- «Δόξα σοι Κύριε-Εις πολλά έτη» sung after Gospel (echos tetartos, phthora nisabur according to patriarchal gospel recitation)

==== Cherubim chant ====
- Two weekly cycles (echos protos, varys, tetartos, plagios tetartos, plagios protos) in various transcriptions by Chourmouzios the Archivist, Gregorios the Protopsaltes etc.
- One cycle of long cherouvika with teretismata (eight echoi)
- Two anticherouvika for Maundy Thursday «Του δείπνου σου» (echos plagios devteros, echos tetartos)
- Anticherouvikon for Holy Saturday «Σιγησάτω» (echos plagios protos)
- Two anticherouvika or the Liturgy of Presanctified Gifts «Κατευθυνθήτω» (echos plagios protos) and «Νυν αι δυνάμεις» (echos plagios devteros)

==== Communion chant ====
- Weekly cycle (Monday-Saturday)
- Monday (echos protos, Angelic Feasts), Wednesday (echos protos, Elevation of the Cross!), and Thursday Koinonikon (echos devteros, Apostle feasts) in long versions
- Sunday Koinonikon cycle (long melos, eight echoi)
- Menaion cycle
  - Koinonikon for Cross Elevation «Εσημειώθη εφ'ημάς» (echos plagios protos)
  - Christmas Koinonikon «Λύτρωσιν απέστειλε Κύριος» (echos plagios protos)
  - Epiphany Koinonikon «Επιφανή χάρις του Θεού» (echos varys)
  - Annunciation Koinonikon (25 March) «Εξελέξατο κύριος την Σιών» (echos protos)
  - Two Koinonika for Transfiguration (6 August) «Εν τω φωτί της δόξης» (echos tritos, plagios tetartos)
- Triodion cycle
  - Koinonikon for Lazarus Saturday «Εκ στόματος νηπίων» (echos protos)
  - Koinonikon for Palm Sunday «Ευλογημένος ο ερχόμενος» (echos tetartos)
  - Koinonikon for Holy Saturday «Εξηγέρθη ως ο υπνών» (echos protos)
- Pentekostarion cycle
  - Two Easter Koinonika «Σώμα Χριστού μεταλάβετε» (echos protos, echos plagios protos)
  - Antipascha Koinonikon «Επαίνει Ιερουσαλήμ τον Κύριον» (echos plagios protos)
  - Mid-Pentecost Koinonikon «Ο τρώγων μου την σάρκα» (echos tetartos)
  - Koinonikon for Ascension «Ανέβη ο Θεός εν αλαλαγμώ» (echos tetartos)
  - Pentecost Koinonikon «Το πνεύμα σου το αγαθόν» (echos varys)
  - Two All Saints Koinonika «Αγαλλιάσθε δίκαιοι εν Κυρίω» (echos plagios protos)

==== Older psaltic compositions ====
- Leitourgika by Ioannes Glykys
- Allelouiarion «Ιδού ο Νυμφίος»

=== Mathemata and kratemata ===
- John Koukouzeles' mathema Mega Ison
- Despotikon «Τον Δεσπότην και Αρχιερέα» (echos protovarys)
- Great Trisagion for funerals (echos plagios devteros, phthora nenano)
- Theotokion kalophonikon «Σε μεγαλύνομεν» (diatonic echos varys)
- John Koukouzeles' Theotokion kalophonikon «Ανωθεν οι Προφήται» (diatonic echos varys)
- Akathistos kalophonikos «Ξένον Τόκον» (diatonic echos varys)
- Exegeseis of older kalophonic compositions of the Oikematarion

==== Heirmologion kalophonikon ====
- Heirmos kalophonikos «Γόνυ κάμπτει» (echos tritos)
- Heirmos kalophonikos «Ουρανός πολύφωτος» (diatonic echos varys)
- Exegeseis of older kalophonic compositions of the old Heirmologion
- Six kratemata (2 in echos protos, 1 in echos legetos, tritos, plagios protos, plagios tetartos)

==== Sticherarion kalophonikon ====
- Sticheron kalophonikon (St. Euphemia) «Λίαν εύφρανας» (echos tritos)
- Exegeseis of older kalophonic compositions of the old Sticherarion
- probably two of the kratemata printed in Gregorios the Protopsaltes' Heirmologion kalophonikon were composed as conclusions for the stichera kalophonika «Αναστάσεως ημέρα» (echos protos) and «Λίαν εύφρανας» (echos tritos)

=== Makam music ===
The recent research by Kyriakos Kalaitzidis has analysed 72 manuscripts which have makam music transcribed into Greek neumes between the 15th and the 19th centuries. Within this repertoire more than 100 compositions are ascribed to Petros, among them about 14 Phanariot songs. He also transcribed many other Ottoman composers. Although there are no contributions by Panagiotes Halacoğlu, Ioannes' teacher, his school together with Kyrillos Marmarinos' transcription of makam seyirler seems to be an essential contribution which encouraged other Phanariotes to follow his example. In comparison, 2 makam compositions by Kyrillos survived, 2 others by Ioannes. There is no composition ascribed to Daniel, but the music manuscripts written by himself had been burnt in its library, and most of the makam music transcribed by Petros have no ascriptions at all. 12 compositions are ascribed to Iakovos the Protopsaltes, 10 to Petros' student Petros Byzantios, even Gregorios the Protopsaltes who was a student of the Mevlevi composer Dede Efendi, left not more than 31 compositions in sources with Greek neumes. The very truth behind Petros' reputation as Hırsız ("thief") as it was documented by Georgios Papadopoulos, is that Petros had a crucial role as a notator of the Patriarchate, despite his short lifetime and his early announcement as lampadarios, he must have continued to fulfill his former duties as a second domestikos even as lampadarios. But the difficult question of authorship has to be revealed by further research.

== Reception ==
In the current tradition of Orthodox chant, known as "Psaltike" (the heritage of Byzantine psaltic art), the contributions of Petros Peloponnesios (his Katavasies for the Heirmologion, his Doxastarion and many of his compositions for the Anthology of the liturgies) are dominant in the neumed editions of Orthodox chant in Bulgaria, Romania, Macedonia, Serbia and Greece.

== Works ==
=== Manuscripts in exegetic notation ===
==== Church music ====
- Petros Peloponnesios. "London, British Library, Ms. Add. 16971". Katavasiai (Heirmologion argon), Prosomoia, and an incomplete Anthology for the Divine Liturgies (18th century). British Library.
- Petros Peloponnesios; Petros Byzantios. "London, British Library, Ms. Add. 17718". Anastasimatarion and Doxastarion (about 1800). British Library.
- John Koukouzeles; Germanos of New Patras; Panagiotes the New Chrysaphes; Balasios Iereos; Petros Bereketes; Anastasios Skete; Petros Peloponnesios; Petros Byzantios. "Athens, Ιστορικό και Παλαιογραφικό Αρχείο (ΙΠΑ), MIET, Ms. Pezarou 15". Anthologiai of Psaltic Art (late 18th century). Athens: Μορφωτικό Ίδρυμα Εθνικής Τράπεζας. Archived from the original on 4 March 2016.
- Petros Peloponnesios (4 July 2009). "University of Birmingham, Cadbury Research Library, Ms. Mingana Gr. 5". Katavasies (Heirmologion argon) in the possession of Makarios Hieromonachos (18th century).
- Petros Peloponnesios (4 July 2009). "University of Birmingham, Cadbury Research Library, Ms. Mingana Gr. 7". Doxastarion syntomon (Menaion, Triodion and Pentekostarion) copied by Anastasios Proikonesios (18th century).
- Petros Peloponnesios (1775). "Bucharest, Stavropoleos Monastery, Gr. Ms. F 48m". Doxastarion syntomon (Menaion, Triodion and Pentekostarion) copied by Athanasios Photeinos. Stavropoleos Monastery. Archived from the original on 2016-01-25.
- Daniel the Protopsaltes; Iakovos the Protopsaltes; Petros Peloponnesios. "Sofia, St. Cyril and St. Methodius National Library, Ms. Gr. 76". Anthology with Makarismoi, Kekragaria palaia, Anthologies of Orthros and Liturgies (early 19th century).
- Panagiotes the New Chrysaphes; Petros Bereketes; Ioannes the Protopsaltes; Daniel the Protopsaltes; Petros Peloponnesios; Petros Byzantios. "Larissa, Δημόσια Κεντρική Βιβλιοθήκη "Κωνσταντίνος Κούμας", Ms. 5753". Anthology with Makarismoi, Kekragaria palaia, Anthology for Orthros and for the Liturgies, Mathematarion, Heirmologion kalophonikon and Heirmologion of the Katavasiai (early 19th century).
- Petros Peloponnesios; Daniel the Protopsaltes (1800). "Εθνικό και Καποδιστριακό Πανεπιστήμιο Αθηνών, Τμήμα Μουσικών Σπουδών, Βιβλιοθήκη Τμήματος Μουσικών Σπουδών, Gregorios Protopsaltes Archive, Dossier 133". Mathemata (Stichera kalophonika for 15, 16 August, 20 October).
- Petros Peloponnesios (1800). "Εθνικό και Καποδιστριακό Πανεπιστήμιο Αθηνών, Τμήμα Μουσικών Σπουδών, Βιβλιοθήκη Τμήματος Μουσικών Σπουδών, Gregorios Protopsaltes Archive, Dossier 20". Cherouvika.
- Petros Peloponnesios; Daniel the Protopsaltes (1800). "Εθνικό και Καποδιστριακό Πανεπιστήμιο Αθηνών, Τμήμα Μουσικών Σπουδών, Βιβλιοθήκη Τμήματος Μουσικών Σπουδών, Gregorios Protopsaltes Archive, Dossier 44". Koinonika.

==== Makam music ====
- Petros Peloponnesios Lampadarios. "Εθνικό και Καποδιστριακό Πανεπιστήμιο Αθηνών, Τμήμα Μουσικών Σπουδών, Βιβλιοθήκη Τμήματος Μουσικών Σπουδών, Gregorios Protopsaltes Archive, Dossier 60". Collection of with rare compositions of Ottoman makam music (fer’-i muḥammes, peşrevler, terkîbler, semâ’î) transcribed in exegetic neume notation.
- Petros Peloponnesios Lampadarios (1775). "Εθνικό και Καποδιστριακό Πανεπιστήμιο Αθηνών, Τμήμα Μουσικών Σπουδών, Βιβλιοθήκη Τμήματος Μουσικών Σπουδών, Gregorios Protopsaltes Archive, Dossier 137". Collection of Byzantine (including John Koukouzeles' "Mega Ison") and Ottoman vocal music (besteler) of Constantinople between the 16th and 18th centuries (Ağa family) transcribed in Petros' exegetic neume notation.

=== Printed and transcribed editions of Petros Peloponnesios' works ===
==== Petros' Anastasimatarion and its translation into Romanian and into Old Church Slavonic ====
- Petros Peloponnesios; Petros Byzantios. Gregorios the Protopsaltes (transcription) (ed.). "University of Birmingham, Cadbury Research Library, Ms. Mingana Gr. 8". Petros Peloponnesios' Anastasimatarion with the Hesperinos cycle (including Pasapnoaria), the Kekragaria (syntoma cycle) and Petros Byzantios' version of the whole psalm 140 at the end, and 11 stichera heothina transcribed by Gregorios the Protopsaltes (early 19th century).
- Ephesios, Petros Manuel, ed. (1820). Νέον Αναστασιματάριον μεταφρασθέν κατά την καινοφανή μέθοδον της μουσικής υπό των εν Κωνσταντινουπόλει μουσικολογιωτάτων Διδασκάλων και εφευρετών του νέου μουσικού συστήματος. Bucharest.
- Macarie Ieromonahul, ed. (1823). Anastasimatariu Bisericesc după aşăzămîntul Sistimii Ceii noao. Vienna: Mekhitarist Armenians.
- Todorov, Manasij Pop, ed. (1914). Воскресникъ сирѣчъ Осмогласенъ Учебникъ съдържашъ воскресната служба и всизкитѣ подобин на осъмтѣхъ гласа. Sofia: Carska Pridvorna Pečatnica.

===== Gregorios' transcription of Daniel the Protopsaltes' 'Anastasimatarion syntomon' (heirmologic melos) =====
- Petros Peloponnesios (c. 1818). Gregorios the Protopsaltes (transcription) (ed.). "Αναστασιματάριον σύντομον κατά το ύφος της μεγάλης εκκλησίας μελοποιηθέν παρά κυρ Πέτρου Λαμπαδαρίου του Πελοποννησίου· εξηγηθέν κατά τον νέον της μουσικής τρόπον παρά Γρηγορίου Πρωτοψάλτου". Naoussa, Pontians' National Library of Argyroupolis ‘Kyriakides’, Ms. Sigalas 52. Naoussa: Aristotle University of Thessaloniki.
- Petros Peloponnesios; Ioannes the Protopsaltes (1905). Αναστασιματάριον νέον άργον και σύντομον μετά προσθηκής των στίχων, κανώνων, καταβασίων και τινών αλλών αναγκαίων. Istanbul: Publisher of the Patriarchate. pp. 441–538.

===== Chourmouzios' transcription of the 'Anastasimatarion neon' (sticheraric and heirmologic melos) =====
- Petros Peloponnesios Lampadarios; Chourmouzios the Archivist (1832). Theodoros Phokaeos (ed.). Αναστασιματάριον νέον μεταφρασθέντα εις το νέον της μουσικής σύστημα παρά του διδασκάλου Χουρμουζίου Χαρτοφύλακος, και του κυρίου Θεοδώρου Φωκέως. Περιέχον τα Αναστάσιμα του Εσπερινού, Όρθρου, και Λειτουργίας, μετά των αναστασίμων Κανόνων, Μαρτυρικών, και Νεκρωσίμων της Μεγάλης Τεσσαρακοστής, των τε Εωθινών, και των συντόνων Τιμιωτέρων. Τα πάντα καθώς την σήμερον ψάλλονται εις το Πατριαρχείον μεταφρασθέντα εις το νέον της μουσικής σύστημα παρά του διδασκάλου Χουρμουζίου Χαρτοφύλακος, και του κυρίου Θεοδώρου Φωκέως. Istanbul: Isaac de Castro.

==== Heirmologion of the Katavasiai (heirmologion argon) ====
- Petros Peloponnesios Lampadarios; Petros Byzantios (1825). Chourmouzios Chartophylakos (ed.). Ειρμολόγιον των καταβασιών Πέτρου του Πελοποννησίου μετά του συντόμου Ειρμολογίου Πέτρου Πρωτοψάλτου του Βυζαντίου: Εξηγημένα κατά την νέαν της μουσικής μέθοδον μετά προσθήκης ικανών μαθημάτων, ων εστερούντο εις το παλαιόν. Επιθεωρηθέντα ήδη, και ακριβώς διορθωθέντα παρά του Διδασκάλου Χουρμουζίου Χαρτοφύλακος. Istanbul: Isaac De Castro.
- Todorov, Manasij Pop, ed. (1992). Псалтикиина Утренна (reprint ed.). Sofia: Sinodalno Izdatelstvo. pp. 158–235.

==== Doxastarion syntomon (fast sticheraric melos) ====
- Petros Peloponnesios Lampadarios (1820). Petros Ephesios (ed.). Σύντομον δοξαστάριον του αοιδίμου Πέτρου Λαμπαδαρίου του Πελοποννησίουν: Μεταφρασθέν κατά την νέαν μέθοδον της Μουσικής των Μουσικολογιωτάτων Διδασκάλων του νέου Συστήματος. Bucharest: Nikolau S. Alexandru.
- Petros Peloponnesios Lampadarios (1899). Biolakis, Georgios; Klavvas, Konstantinos; Nafpliotis, Iakovos (eds.). Το Δοξαστάριον Πέτρου Πελοποννησίου; εξηγηθέν πιστώς εκ της αρχαίας εις την καθ' ημάς γραφήν υπό του Πρωτοψάλτου της Μεγάλης του Χριστού Εκκλησίας Γεωργίου Βιολάκη. Vol. 1–2. Istanbul: Publisher of the Patriarchate.

==== John Koukouzeles' 'Mega Ison' (Chourmouzios' transcription of Petros Peloponnesios' exegesis) ====
- John Koukouzeles; Petros Peloponnesios; Chourmouzios Chartophylakos (1896). Kyriazides, Agathangelos (ed.). "Τὸ Μέγα Ἴσον τῆς Παπαδικῆς μελισθὲν παρὰ Ἰωάννου Μαΐστορος τοῦ Κουκκουζέλη". Ἐν Ἄνθος τῆς καθ' ἡμᾶς Ἐκκλησιαστικῆς Μουσικῆς περιέχον τὴν Ἀκολουθίαν τοῦ Ἐσπερίνου, τοῦ Ὅρθρου καὶ τῆς Λειτουργίας μετὰ καλλοφωνικῶν Εἴρμων μελοποιηθὲν παρὰ διάφορων ἀρχαιῶν καὶ νεωτερῶν Μουσικόδιδασκαλων. Istanbul: 127–144.
