= Iakovos Nafpliotis =

Greek Christian cantor

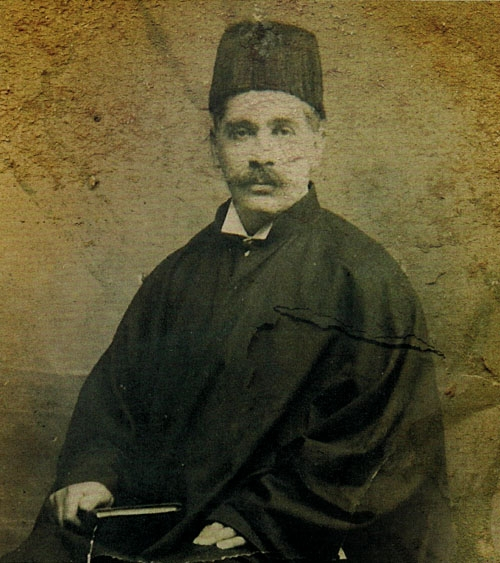
Iakovos Nafpliotis

Iakovos Nafpliotis, (or Nafpliotis or Naupliotis or Naupliotes: Greek: Ἰάκωβος Ναυπλιώτης) (1864 in Naxos – December 5, 1942 in Athens) was the Archon Protopsaltis (First cantor) of the Holy and Great Church of Christ in Constantinople (Istanbul, Turkey). Iakovos Nafpliotis is one of the first chanters to have ever been recorded; many people also regard him as being one of the greatest.

== Biography ==
=== Early life ===
Iakovos Nafpliotis was born in Greece, on the island of Naxos (Cyclades) in 1864. The Nafpliotis family, which was originally called "Anapliotis", originated from Anaplous (an area along the western shore of the Bosphorus), and ran a printing shop in Naxos until the first half of the 19th century. The first to change the name from "Anapliotis" to "Nafpliotis" was Anastasios Anapliotis, who was a member of the Philiki Etairia.

=== Musical education ===
Iakovos travelled to Constantinople at the age of seven, where he was acclaimed for his exceptional vocal quality and was ordained as canonarch at the church Saint Nicholas. He was later on ordained as First Canonarch of St. George's Greek Orthodox Patriarchal Church in 1878 (when he was only 14 years old) and served this function for three years.

Iakovos had heard exceptional Patriarchal protopsaltes (right chorus leading chanters) such as Ioannis Byzantios (the surname "Byzantios" meaning "originating from Constantinople"), Konstantinos Byzantios and Georgios Raidestinos II (the surname "Raidestinos" meaning "originating from Raidestos"). They, in turn, had heard their predecessors: Daniel from Tyrnabos, Iakovos Giakoumakis from Peloponnesos, Petros Byzantios, and Gregorios the Levite. Iakovos' main teacher was Nikolaos Stoyianovitz the Lambadarios (left chorus leading chanter).

=== Main career ===
Iakovos Nafpliotis was the last chanter to have progressively passed through all the psaltic ophikion (officium) stages, in the following order and duration:

- First Canonarchos: 1878 to 1881 (14 to 17 years of age = 3 years of service)
- Second Domestikos: 1881 to 1888, (17 to 24 years of age = 7 years of service)
- First Domestikos: 1888 to 1905 (24 to 41 years of age = 17 years of service)
- Archon Lampadarios: 1905 to 1911, (41 to 47 years of age = 6 years of service)
- Archon Protopsaltes: 1911 to 1938 (47 to 74 = 27 years of service).

Iakovos Nafpliotis served at the Patriarchal Analogion for 60 years, and was blessed with the privilege of having chanted for a succession of 14 Patriarchs.

According to Angelos Boudouris, Iakovos Nafpliotis was concerned about the relative ignorance of chanters who were introduced into the Patriarchal Cathedral without going through the necessary officiums (such as the musicologist Protopsaltis Georgios Biolakis), and who were said by others to not be as proficient in the local Patriarchal style (hyphos) as was Iakovos. Iakovos, along with those of his subordinates, who had grown up in the Patriarchate, would "drag newcomers by the nose" in an obstinate effort to safekeep the tradition they had been taught. The unfortunate newcomers had no choice but to "follow along", in spite of their superior official positions. Boudouris was able to testify to all this because he grew up in the Patriarcheion as well, during the early 1900s.

Despite the general respect of Iakovos by the majority of people around him, there were several unsuccessful attempts to have him removed from the Patriarchate: Iakovos was actually replaced twice as Protopsaltis.

Stylianos Tsolakidis, who was the First Canonarchos and later on helper Domestichos of Iakovos Nafpliotis – for a total of about 10 years – during the 1910 decade, claimed that Iakovos Nafpliotis was "a serious chanter and teacher, and that no one of his time chanted like him". Stylianos Tsolakidis had also chanted along Georgios Binakis (student of Nikolaos Raidestinos [who Tsolakidis had heard chant at a very late age], son and student of Georgios Raidestinos II) as first Canonarchos for two years, and along Nileas Kamarados as well, but no one in Constantinople had the "psaltic stability" or "stamima" of Iakovos. According to his testimony, Iakovos would chant everything by heart, in an upright position, without any corporal motion whatsoever, his lips barely moving. According to both Boudouris and Tsolakidis, Iakovos avoided talking in everyday life.

Iakovos Nafpliotis was once replaced for 6 months by Antonios Syrkas in the late 1930s. According to Boudouris, the latter did not know much about the Patriarchal method of chanting. During this period, Iakovos contemplated leaving Constantinople, given that some Greeks had doubts as to his right to remain on the Patriarchal analogion in terms of his citizenship, which (fortunately) did not seem to be an issue for the Turkish authorities.

=== Later years ===
On the occasion of his 50th year of service, the entire personnel was remunerated in double.

Upon his retirement, the Patriarch Benjamin I bestowed upon him the title of "Honorary Protopsaltes of the Holy and Great Church of Christ".

Iakovos Nafpliotis retired in Athens, a city chosen by members of his family, where he died in 1942 at the age of 78 years. He was buried in the First Cemetery of Athens.

== Works ==
The disciple of Iakovos Nafpliotis, Angelos Boudouris, has left behind almost ten thousand pages of authentic psaltic manuscripts of which many include transcriptions of Iakovos’ traditional interpretations of the entire year-round, functional psaltic repertoire. Angelos Boudouris informs his readers that this great teacher had learned how to chant traditionally during his apprenticeship as second Domestikos next to the Lampadarios Nikolaos Stoyianovitz, who knew nothing of the reformed Round notation (also known as the Neo-Byzantine notation or Contemporary psaltic notation), which was in current use since Chrysanthos of Madytos.

During his service as first Domestikos, Iakovos Nafpliotis helped transcribe old notation books according to the reformed notation of the New Method (1899: Doxastarion of Petros Peloponnesios). He taught "psaltiki," or "the psaltic art" at the Patriarchal Music school of Phanarion in the Μεγάλη τοῦ Γένους Σχολὴ (also known as the Halki seminary), and also published a book in three volumes: the Forminx (the very name Konstantinos Pringos used later on for his own editions), which contains various hymns and songs for use in elementary schools.

Angelos Boudouris made extraordinary efforts to transcribe Iakovos’ performances of classical pieces, either by bringing his manuscripts to the Patriarchal church so as to modify them from one year to the next, or by listening to his children, Constantinos and Leontios (both Canonarchs of Iakovos), chant whatever their teacher had taught them. Nevertheless, Iakovos could not understand the purpose of such transcriptions, for he knew and taught everything by heart by continuous repetition. The Canonarchs would learn in this manner, after they had studied "παραλλαγή" ("solfeggio") of the classical pieces with their master.

== Recordings ==
His voice was recorded owing to the foresight of Patriarch Germanos V (1913–1918), who even contributed from his personal purse so as to finance some of the historic plates which were recorded under the label "Orfeon Records". Most of these recordings were realised with Konstantinos Pringos, who was actually protopsaltis in another church in Constantinople at the time.

According to the Protocanonarchos Stylianos Tsolakidis, these recordings are more of paedagogical nature: the tempo is very slow (which was eventually accelerated whenever there was lack of recording time), there is hardly any συνεπτυγμένος χρόνος-syneptigmenos chronos (a form of rubato), and analyseis - ἀναλύσεις (developments) are maintained to a strict minimum. This is the way Iakovos would chant so as to teach the basics of a hymn the "first time around". During live, ecclesiastical performances of these hymns in the Patriarchate, the interpretations were slightly more vivid, due in part to a variety of rhythmic nuances, yet never too far off from the actual recordings.

No one seems to know exactly how many such plates there really exist. Many originals are to be found in Thessaloniki and have been restored in a project led by Prof. Antonios Alygizakis, which were finally published as CDs by the end of 2008. Some records were obtained from Turkish national archives. Others had been found in the archives of the Hellenic Broadcasting Corporation (ERT). Others claim that the entire collection is to be found in the Cypriot Monastery of Kykkos.

Some of these historic recordings have been put on CD, but we are far from the minimal estimate of 6 hours (300 minutes and, at 3 minutes per plate = about 130 plates) that exist in various collectors’ safe boxes. Recently however these recordings have been put up for the benefit of all, in memory of the chanter, and those who admired him and made enormous sacrifices so as to obtain these recordings.

== Teachings and hyphos (style) ==
The patriarchal paedagogy of Iakovos, which was based in past on o/aural memory transmission, there was one other particularity, that of "chronos" and the way it was counted, which he managed to transmit to at least one of the few students who had the opportunity to be his disciple ever since a young age (Stylianos Tsolakidis, the others being Constantinos and Leontios Boudouris). Other students who studied at a later age (e.g. Angelos Boudouris, Anastasios Michaelides "Sobatzis", Konstantinos Pringos, Georgios Karakasis) were also permeated with many of the elements of Iakovos’ Majestuous Patriarchal style ("hyphos"). The many ways of counting the "chronos" (which is not the "rhythmos") and of combining "analyseis" (developments or "variations") are what allow a good chanter to chant a unique score in many ways, and which can lead to catastrophic performances by those who have not been taught by the Patriarchal method.

Although most of the chanters of Constantinople had good intervals and attacks (which is not the case of most chanters of today), their "politikon hyphos" or "style" is not to be confused with the "patriarchal style", where the repertoire chanted was different not only in composition (usually of abbreviated nature) as compared to some classical editions, but in terms of chronos counting (divided ("dieremenos"), unitary ("monosimos"), simple ("haplos"), complex ("synthetos" or "syneptigmenos chronos" which is not to be confused with syneptigmenos "rhythmos"), free ("elevtheros"), callophonic etc.), as well. Nevertheless, Iakovos would first teach using the classical editions and then only would he initiate his disciples to the particular compositions that were used in the Patriarchal church.

Most of the 14 Patriarchs as well as the numerous hierarchs that crossed Iakovos’ psaltic career were firm supporters of and would acclaim his traditional chanting. Those who were ignorant even went as far as to replace him once. During this episode and after his retirement, some areas of Greece, namely that of Chios, proposed that they add to his retirement funds so that he might continue to honour them with his serious, hegemonic and praying chant.

According to Angelos Boudouris, Iakovos Nafpliotis was a standard of psaltiki that most other chanters acknowledged and respected, which is attested to by the fact that they would meet at the Patriarchal church approximately once a month so as to continue benefiting from this master's knowledge. Few were the chanters who were as traditional. Both Angelos Boudouris as well as Stylianos Tsolakidis mention the traditional Georgios Binakis (first chanter of Agios Ioannis Chios in Constantinople, whose retirement years were supplemented by the merchants of Chios, where he spent the remainder of his life chanting in the Metropolis of Chios). On the other hand, many were those who had personal ideas about manuscripts and composition and chant as a whole (including choral chanting), of which the most famous ones were Konstantinos Psachos and Nileus Kamarados.

== Iakovos Nafpliotis as opposed to other schools of chant (Galatan, Kamarados, etc.) ==
Although Iakovos Nafpliotis' chanting was characterised as "unique", it could be classified into what is commonly known as the "Πατριαρχικὸν ὕφος |Patriarchal Style". This very category is part of a current debate as well, given that some musicologists do not consider Patriarchal chanting in the 1800s as being similar to that which existed before the fall of Constantinople (1453). Notwithstanding the foregoing, the best representative of the "Πατριαρχικὸν ὕφος |Patriarchal Style" as referred to by Boudouris, was Iakovos Nafpliotis.

In his works, Angelos Boudouris remains very critical, and depending on the issue upon which he was focused upon, he would describe a given chanter as being traditional at times while being non traditional in others. A case in point is a supposed rivalry between the "school of Galata" (centered upon Georgios Raidestinos II [1870s], and perpetuated by his son, Nikolaos Raidestinos) and the Old Patriarchal School as represented by Iakovos' teacher, the lambadarios Nikolaos Stoyianovitz. Although some unpleasant scenes between Georgios Raidestinos II and lambadarios Nikolaos Stoyianovitz could be interpreted as a clash between the two schools, the differences between them were minute, the proof being that Boudouris claims elsewhere that Georgios Binakis (student of the so-called "Galatan" school) was an excellent and traditional chanter, such an elogy being very rare in his memoirs. Further proof is that Stylianos Tsolakis, student of Iakovos, recognised patriarchal chanting ("πατριαρχικὰ ἀκούσματα") in the chanting of Alexandros Mardas (student of Nikolaos Chantzistamatis, student of Georgios Binakis, whom Stylianos had as a teacher as well).

Differences between the "Πατριαρχικὸν ὕφος |Patriarchal Style" of Iakovos Nafpliotis and the "Kamarados" school (as represented by Nileus Kamarados and his student Antonios Syrkas and followers such as the late Georgios Syrkas and the current Archon Protopsaltis of Canada, Constantinos Lagouros) are slightly greater, and Angelos Boudouris' criticisms were restrained to knowledge of how and when particular hymns were to be chanted.

As concerns the "Πατριαρχικὸν ὕφος |Patriarchal Style" of Iakovos Nafpliotis and what later on became known as the school of "Simon Karas", Angelos Boudouris, as opposed to the aforementioned schools, quotes Iakovos' unilateral opinion as far as music is concerned, even though merit was granted for Karas' intentions and initiatives.

== Iakovos Nafpliotis on Simon Karas ==
Iakovos also met and heard Simon Karas, a music researcher whose ideas and "style" of chanting is known worldwide but is also contested by many (namely the Hypermachos Association) in Greece. Simon Karas is one of the few musicians that Iakovos Nafpliotis, who was otherwise very conservative, even in the number of words he'd utter, criticizes overtly by stating the following:

The teacher has formed the opinion that Karas is an intellectual man ("λόγιος - logios") with a desire to work on the matters of our music, of which music he happens to be a fan and supporter ("θιασώτης καὶ ὑποστηρικτὴς - thiaswtis kai hyposthrikths"), even though he is not acquainted with it (" ἂν καὶ δὲν τὴν γωνρίζει - an kai den thn gnwrizei").

Iakovos Nafpliotis' opinion is at the center of a flaming current debate, as Simon Karas had collected information concerning oral tradition, much in the same way as other renowned musicologists of his time (for instance Spyridon Peristeris in Athens and Kallinikos Theodoulos in Cyprus). In spite of the worldwide recognition of Simon Karas' musicological positions, which are heralded by many of his students and followers, many are those who hang on to Iakovos' opinion, given the latter's excellence in the practice of ψαλτικὴ ("psaltiki" or "the psaltic art").

== On the correct writing of Nafpliotis' family name ==
His last name is simply Nafpliotis and not o Nafpliotis, which would imply that he had originated from the city of Nafplion. If Iakovos' geographic origins are to be taken into consideration, as is the case with all the great chanters whose names have crossed the centuries (e.g. Petros from Laconia, Peloponnese called Petros o Peloponnesios or Petros Lacedaemon), one may wish to call Iakovos Nafpliotis by the following: Iakovos Nafpliotis o ek Naxou the Megaloprepis, (Iakovos Nafpliotis from Naxos, the Majestuous Protopsaltis) so as to distinguish him from his predecessors of the same first name (e.g. Iakovos Peloponnesios).

== Bibliography ==
- Nafpliotis, Iakovos, ed. (1894). Φόρμιγξ ήτοι συλλογή ασμάτων και ωδών των μεν μετενεχθέντων εκ της ευρωπαϊκής μουσικής γραφής εις την καθ' ημάς εκκλησιαστικήν, τω δε πρωτοτύπων όλως. Φόρμιγξ. Vol. 1–3. Istanbul: Publisher of the Patriarchate.
- Petros Peloponnesios the Lampadarios (1899). Biolakis, Georgios; Klavvas, Konstantinos; Nafpliotis, Iakovos (eds.). Το Δοξαστάριον Πέτρου Πελοποννησίου; εξηγηθέν πιστώς εκ της αρχαίας εις την καθ' ημάς γραφήν υπό του Πρωτοψάλτου της Μεγάλης του Χριστού Εκκλησίας Γεωργίου Βιολάκη. Vol. 1–2. Istanbul: Publisher of the Patriarchate.
