= Petros Bereketis =

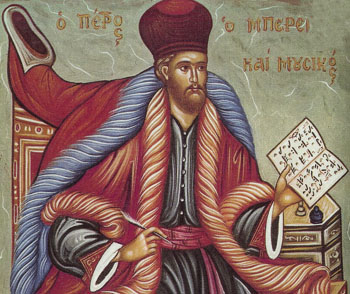
Petros Bereketis painted in a manuscript of 1790, holding a book with the beginning of his composition Θεοτόκε παρθένε (Monastery of Iviron, GR-AOi Ms. 327, f. 1v)

Petros Bereketis (Greek: Πέτρος Μπερεκέτης) or Peter the Sweet (Πέτρος ο Γλυκής) was one of the most innovative musicians of 17th-century Constantinople (Ottoman period). He, together with Panagiotes the New Chrysaphes, Balasios the Priest and Germanos Bishop of New Patras was one of the most influential figures in the evolution of the Byzantine psaltic art following the fall of Constantinople in 1453, although he never was associated with the Patriarchate in Fener. For many years, he served as the protopsaltis (first cantor) of the parochial church St. Constantine of the Hypsomatheia (Samatya) quarter close to the Marmara coast.

During his lifetime, which is approximately supposed to be between 1665 and 1725, while Chrysanthos mentioned that he served there in the time of the Archon Protopsaltis at the Great Church of Christ of Panagiotis Halatzoglou and his Lampadarios John Trapezountios (1727–1748).

== Education ==
Nothing is known about his real life time, so that Gregorios Stathis assumed that there was a confusion between Petros Bereketis, John Trapezountios' student Petros Peloponnesios and the latter's follower Petros Byzantios. Petros Bereketis began his musical studies in his home city of Constantinople, but later visited Mount Athos for a considerable length of time to study under the noted teacher of Constantinopolitan musicians, the Moldavian monk Damian of Vatopedi (1650–1720).

== Compositions ==
The surviving compositional corpus left by Bereketis is extensive, spanning works across all ecclesiastical genres including communion chants (koinonika for both Sundays and weekdays), papadic doxologies, cherubic hymns, kratemata, pasapnoaria, polyelea, doxastica and katavasies for various feast days. Among the more notable of his compositions is the eight-mode setting of "O Theotokos and Virgin" for two alternating choirs, most commonly chanted in all-night vigils on Mount Athos and in Seminaries.

=== Heirmoi kalophonikoi ===
In particular, his musical settings of the heirmoi (unsurpassed both in quality and in quantity by his contemporaries) gave rise to a style of paraliturgical chant that came to be known as the 'kalophonic heirmological style', named for a certain method of melodic thesis which referred to the Old Heirmologion, but in a soloistic and rather deliberate way characterised as kalophonic ("beautifully sounding") melos. With respect to Petros' exceptional talent which he mainly developed in the genre of kalophonic heirmos, he is sometimes referred to as the "father of kalophonic heirmoi," although the genre existed since Byzantine times and it had already been revived by Balasios and some other contemporary composers like Germanos. Petros in fact got acquainted to this genre during his studies with Damian at Vatopedi Monastery, and within the well-known collection of the heirmologion kalophonikon, entirely created by composers during the Ottoman period, and other not so well-known prints and sources not less than about 45 compositions are ascribed to him.

The name "Bereketis" is derived from the Turkish word "bereket" (literally "abundance") with which he was known to reply to his students' eager requests for more kalophonic heirmoi or other mathemata to study. Already Balasios the Priest had made the heirmos kalophonikos to one of the most important genres of Ottoman Greek music. This genre was paraliturgical and therefore more experimental than the kalophonic way to compose stichera, which was already established by Late Byzantine composers like John Koukouzelis and Manuel Chrysaphes. The Ottoman collection of heirmoi kalophonikoi became more popular than the Byzantine stichera kalophonika within the living tradition of Orthodox chant, and it was published in the transcription of Gregorios the Protopsaltis by Theodoros Phokaeos. But there are handwritten heirmologia kalophonika notated in exegetic neume notation whose collection are not in every respect identical.

The surviving works of Bereketis were transcribed from the old system of Byzantine parasemantic notation largely by Gregorios the Protopsaltis and his colleague Chrysanthos of Madytos near the beginning of the 18th century. The transcriptions by Gregorios had been republished in two volumes by Charalambos Karakatsanis.

=== Contributions to the genres of the divine liturgies ===
The eight-mode, two choir structure format employed by Bereketis in his notable setting of "O Theotokos and Virgin" was inspired by a similar composition ("More Honourable than the Cherubim") by Constantine of Aghialos, written several centuries earlier. After Bereketis, this style became more common and was used several times by later composers, including Nikolaos of Smyrna (in two works entitled "We Have Seen the True Light" and "Unfading Rose"), Monk Ioasaph of the monastery of Dionysiou on Mount Athos (very slow apolytikia of the despotic feasts of the Church), John the Protopsaltis, Theodore Phokaeus, Stephanos the Lambadarios, and Chourmouzios the Archivist of the Great Church.

Bereketis also composed two large cycles of the papadic genre (cherubic hymn and Sunday koinonikon) that are formulaically valid, since the formulas were not written out in Middle Byzantine notation, they were rather part of the performance based on conventional melopœia. One cherubikon as well as one version of the Sunday koinonikon can be chanted in any of the eight Byzantine modes without alteration of the actual neumes, varying only the starting pitch.

== List of works ==
This list is incomplete. Most of the works are included in the collection of the Archive of the Elders on the island of Syme, Ms. 341, but the last part of the collection was destroyed, the Mathematarion of the Menaion is damaged after January (only the first half has survived), and the main collection of heirmologion kalophonikon is missing, except some kalophonic settings of Theotokia which had been arranged in octoechos order. The heirmoi kalophonikoi are mainly known in the printed exegesis by Gregorios the Protopsaltes, while Oktaecha cycles (cherubikon and Sunday koinonikon) are better known according to the transcription made by Chourmouzios, but both teachers at the Music School did an almost complete transcription of Bereketis' compositions. It proves that they were already appreciated at the Patriarchate by the turn to the 19th century. It should be also mentioned that there was an own Romanian reception since the 17th century especially of the heirmologion kalophonikon, which was taught in Jassy by Dionysios Photeinos and also Gregorios the Protopsaltes had to move there.

=== Troparic and psalmodic compositions of the octoechos ===
==== Polyeleos compositions ====
- Δούλοι Κύριον (Ps. 134 "Servants of the Lord"), plagal first mode (echos plagios tou protos) and plagal fourth mode (echos plagios tetartos)
- Ἐξομολογεῖσθε τῷ κυρίῳ (Ps. 135 "Give thanks"), plagal second mode (echos plagios devteros)

==== Kalophonic settings of Theotokia ====
- Θεοτόκε μὴ παρίδης μὲ, second mode
- Θεοτόκε, σὺ εἶ ἡ ἄμπελος, plagal second mode
- Οἱ ἐλπίδα καὶ στήριγμα, plagal fourth mode
- Σὲ μεγαλύνομεν τὴν ὄντως Θεοτόκον, grave mode
- Ψαλμοῖς καὶ ὕμνοις σὲ ὑμνῷ παρθενομήτορ, plagal fourth mode
- Ώ δέσποινα πανάχραντε, Megalynarion, plagal first mode

=== Heirmologic compositions ===
==== 45 kalophonic heirmoi including their kratemata ====
===== Echos protos =====
- Ἀπὸ τοῦ θρόνου κατήλθεν
- Αὕτη ἡ κλητὴ καὶ ἁγία ἡμέρα
- Δεῦτε πόμα πίωμεν καινόν
- Ἐν τῇ βροντώσῃ καμίνῳ
- Ἡ τρίφωτος οὐσία
- Ἴδε ἣν προέφης
- Ποίαν σοι ἐπάξιον
- Συνέχομαι πάντοθεν
- Tὴν σὴν εἰρήνην
- ᾨδὴν ἐπινίκιον
- Ὤ θείας! ὢ φίλης!
- Ὢ τῶν ὑπὲρ νοῦν θαυμάτων tetraphonon (κε)

===== Echos devteros =====
- Ἐν βυθῷ κατέστρωσε ποτὲ (echos legetos)
- Ἐπίβλεψον, ἐν εὐμενεία

===== Echos tritos =====
- Θεοτόκε ἡ ἐλπίς, πάντων
- Λατρεύειν ζῶντι Θεῷ
- Πάναγνε ἡ μόνῃ τῷ πλαστουργῷ
- Τὴν πᾶσαν ἐλπίδα μου

===== Echos tetartos =====
- Ἐσείσθησαν λαοὶ
- Σέ τὸ καθαρότατον
- Tῇ εἰκόνι τῇ χρυσῇ
- Xαῖρε φωτὸς νεφέλῃ
- Xαῖροις ἄνασσα

===== Echos plagios protos =====
- Ἀντίληψις μου κόρη
- Ὁ ἄγγελος ἐβόα
- Στένω, ἐκ βαθέων τῆς ψυχῆς
- Xαῖρε πύλῃ Kυρίου

===== Echos plagios devteros =====
- Ἀπὸ τῶν πολλῶν μου
- Ἐν λύπαις γὰρ
- Θεὸν ἀνθρῶποις
- Ὁ μέγας προέγραψεν
- Tὸ ὄμμα τῆς καρδίας μου

===== Echos varys =====
- Πᾶσαν τὴν ἐλπίδα μου
- Χαῖρε Νύμφῃ φαεινὴ, Μήτηρ

===== Echos plagios tetartos =====
- Ἄγγελοι καὶ οὐρανοί
- Ἐν κλίνῃ νῦν ἀσθενῶν
- Έφριξε πάσα ακοή
- Κυρίως Θεοτόκον, σὲ ὁμολογοῦμεν
- Mουσικῶν ὀργάνων
- Οἱ τῆς Χαλδαίας καμίνου
- Πῶς σου τὴν χάριν ὑμνήσαιμι
- Τὸν ἄναρχον Βασιλέα

=== Sticherarion kalophonikon ===
==== Menaion ====
- Σὺ Βασιλεῦ, ὁ ὢν, plagal first mode (1 Sept, SAV 8)
- Ἐγκαινίζου ἐγκαινίζου ἡ νέα Ἱερουσαλήμ· first mode (13 Sept, SAV 43)
- Ἡ Ἐλισάβετ συνέλαβε, plagal second mode (14 Sept, Exaltation of the Cross, SAV 611)
- Εὐαγγελιστὰ Ἰωάννη, Ἰσάγγελε Παρθένε, plagal fourth mode (26 Sept, SAV 108)
- Δαυϊτικῶς συνελθόντες οἱ Πιστοὶ, plagal fourth mode (18 Oct, SAV 151)

==== Triodion ====
- Let my prayer be set forth, plagal fourth mode
- Prokeimenon Μὴ ἀποστρέψῃς τὸ πρόσωπόν (Ps. 26:9 "Turn not away Thy face"), plagal fourth mode (echos plagios tetartos)
- Thou hast given an inheritance, plagal fourth mode
- To Thee the champion leader, plagal fourth mode (for two choirs)
- Ἐκ παντοίων κινδύνων τοὺς δούλους, fourth mode

==== Pentekostarion ====
- Ὡς ζωηφόρος, fourth mode
- Ἀνάστα ὁ Θεὸς Arise o God, plagal first mode
- What God is so great as our God, grave mode

=== Kontakia ===
- Χαῖρε, νύμφη ἀνύμφευτε ("Rejoice O unwedded Bride") and Alleluia, plagal fourth mode (echos plagios tetartos), Akrostichon during service of the Akathist
- Τῇ ὑπερμάχῳ (syntomon) plagal fourth mode, Kontakion of the Akathist
- Την ὡραιότητα (argon) third mode, Troparion of the Akathist

=== Papadic compositions ===
==== Cherubikon cycles ====
- First mode (2)
- First mode pentaphonon (ἀπὸ τὸν ζω')
- Second mode
- Third mode
- Fourth mode
- Plagal first mode
- Plagal second mode
- Grave mode (2)
- Plagal fourth mode (2)
- Oktaechon (model "to sing in all eight modes")

==== Anticherubika ====
- Κατευθυνθήτῳ ἡ προσευχή μου, plagal fourth mode (Lessons during the Presanctified Liturgy)
- Νῦν αἱ δυνάμεις τῶν οὐρανῶν, grave mode ("Now the powers of heaven" Presanctified Liturgy)
- Τοῦ δείπνου σου, grave mode (troparion and koinonikon for Holy Thursday)
- Σιγησάτω πᾶσα σὰρξ βροτεία, plagal fourth mode (Holy Saturday)

==== Koinonika ====
Week cycle

- Ὁ ποιῶν τοὺς ἀγγέλους (Ps. 103:4) For Mondays, Archangels, second mode (echos devteros)
- Εἰς μνημόσυνον (Ps. 111:6b) For Tuesdays, St. John Baptist, Hierarchs, Righteous, third mode (echos tritos)
- Ποτήριον σωτηρίου (Ps. 115:4) For Wednesdays and Theotokos, fourth mode (echos tetartos)
- Εἰς πᾶσαν τὴν γῆν ἐξῆλθεν (Ps. 18:5) For Thursdays and Apostolic Feasts, plagal first mode
- Ἐσημειώθη ἐφ᾽ ἡμᾶς τὸ φῶς (Ps. 4:7) For Fridays, Exaltation and Adoration of Cross, grave mode (echos varys)
- Ἀγαλλιᾶσθε, δίκαιοι (Ps. 32:1) For Saturdays, Martyrs, Prophets, All Saints, plagal fourth mode (echos plagios tetartos)
- Αἰνεῖτε τὸν κύριον (Ps. 148:1) For Sundays, Forefeasts (eight mode cycle)
  - One koinonikon to be sung in all the eight modes
  - 4 koinonika of the first mode, 2 tetraphona (ἀπὸ τὸν κε), 1 pentaphonon (ἀπὸ τὸν ζω')
  - second mode (temporary use of phthora nenano)
  - third mode
  - fourth mode
  - plagal first mode
  - plagal second mode (temporary use of phthora nenano)
  - 2 koinonika in grave mode (second with temporary use of phthora nenano)
  - 2 koinonika (one argon version with a long teretismos) in plagal fourth mode

Year cycle

Menaion

- Κύριε, ἠγάπησα εὐπρέπειαν, plagal first mode (Ps 25:8, 13 Sept Encænia)
- Ἐσημειώθῃ ἐφ᾽ ἡμὰς, plagal second mode (Ps 4:7b, 14 Sept Exaltation of the Cross)
- Λύτρωσιν ἀπέστειλε Κύριος, plagal fourth mode syntomon (Ps 110:9a, Christmas)
- Ἐπιφάνη ἡ χάρις τοῦ θεοῦ, first mode (Titus 2:11, Theophany)
- Ἐξελέξατο κύριος τὴν σιών, plagal fourth mode with teretismos (Ps 131:13, 25 Mar Annunciation)
- Ἐν τῷ φωτὶ [τῆς δόξης], grave mode with nenanismata (Ps 88:16b–17a, 7 Aug Transfiguration)
- Koinonikon oktaechon Θεοτόκε παρθένε ("Mother of God, Virgin") echos protos (through eight modes: α'-δ', πλα'-πλδ', α' each section concludes with a transitional teretismos) (15 Aug Dormition of the Theotokos)

Triodion

- Γεύσασθε καὶ ἴδετε (Ps 33:9 "O taste and see"), fourth mode / echos tetartos (Presanctified Liturgy on Wednesday and Friday during Lent)
- Ἐκ στόματος νηπίων, plagal first mode (Ps 8:3a Lazarus Saturday)
- Εὐλογημένος ὁ ἐρχόμενος, plagal first mode with long teretismos (Ps 117:26 Palm Sunday)
- Ἐξηγέρθῃ ὡς ὁ ὑπνῶν, fourth mode (Ps 77:65, Holy Saturday)

Pentekostarion

- Σῶμα χριστοῦ μεταλάβετε, first mode with teretismos (troparion, Easter)
- Ἐπαίνει, Ἱερουσαλήμ, fourth mode (Ps 147:1, Antipascha or Thomas Sunday)
- Ὁ τρώγων μου τὴν σάρκα, fourth mode (John 6:56, Mid-Pentecost)
- Ἀνέβη ὁ θεὸς ἐν ἀλαλαγμῷ, first mode (Ps 46:6, Ascension)
- Τὸ πνεῦμά σου τὸ ἀγαθὸν, plagal fourth mode (Ps 142:10b, Pentecost)
- Ἀγαλλιᾶσθε, δίκαιοι, ἐν τῷ κυρίῳ· fourth mode (Ps 32:1, All Saints)
