= Peter the Byzantine =

- Πέτρος Βυζάντιος
- Born: fl. 1770; Yeniköy, Ottoman Empire
- Died: 1808; Iași, Moldavia
- Other names: Petros Byzantios; Petros "the Fugitive"
- Occupation(s): musician, composer

Domestikos of Ecumenical Patriarchate
- In office c. 1771 – 1789

Lambadarios of Ecumenical Patriarchate
- In office 1789–1800

Arch-cantor of Ecumenical Patriarchate
- In office 1800–1805

Peter the Byzantine (fl. 1770 – 1808), also known as Petros Byzantios (Greek: Πέτρος Βυζάντιος), and "the Fugitive", was a Greek composer and scribe. A pupil of Peter the Peloponnesian, he served the Ecumenical Patriarchate of Constantinople as Domestikos (c. 1771–1789), Lambadarios (1789–1800), and Arch-cantor (1800–1805).

== Biography ==
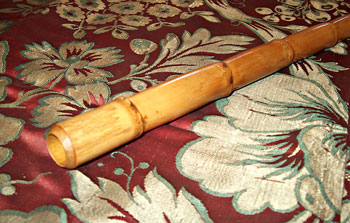
Peter the Byzantine became a virtuoso in handling of Arabian flageolet (ney).

Peter the Byzantine was born near Constantinople in Yeniköy of Bosphorus. There, he began studying music and quickly became a virtuoso of the pandouris and the Arabian flageolet (ney). Peter rose to a number of prominent positions in the Ecumenical Patriarchate of Constantinople, known at that time as the "Great Church of Christ," culminating in his appointment as Arch-cantor in 1800. However, he was sacked by Patriarch Callinicus V of Constantinople in 1805, due to his second marriage, which was not allowed for a cantor. Peter fled to Kherson, hence his name "the Fugitive", and from there to Iași, where he lived until his death in 1808.

== Music ==
Alongside his teaching role, Peter was known for his contributions to the field of chanting, both as a composer and in his explanations of old chantings. He completed both known books of Peter the Peloponnesian, the Anastasimatarion, composing the missing Kekragaria with the incidental Stichologia, and the Heirmologion of Katavasies, adding Heirmoses standards for several holidays. He also pointed at the outset the Short Anastasimatarion and most importantly, for the first time, the Short Heirmologion. He composed many chantings of Priests' Art (Greek: Παπαδική), such as the Κοινωνικά των Kυριακών (three stops) and some of the Ενιαυτός, eight Cherubic Hymns in all modes, Doxologies, two Theotokia, eight Timioteres (Greek: Τιμιωτέρες) for all modes, the Νεκρώσιμος Άμωμος, and some others. His compositions are distinguished by their simplicity and frugality, and he sang his chants, as noted by Chrysanthos of Madytos: "with orderliness, concern, and the appropriate pace of chanting."

=== Manuscripts ===
Peter the Byzantine copied and expounded many manuscripts. His detailed explanations followed the notation system of Peter the Peloponnesian, simplifying them for contemporary use. He was able to explain many chantings, both older and more recent, including:

- Άνωθεν οι προφήται (grave mode) by John Kukuzelis
- Tη υπερμάχω (plagal of 4th mode) by John Kladas
- Θεοτόκε Παρθένε (octoechos) by Petros Bereketis

Many of his works have been preserved. Some are dated between the years 1773–1806, while others are undated. There are also multiple copies of his copies of the works of Peter the Peloponnesian, as well as numerous anthologies of Priests' New Art (Greek: Νέα Παπαδική).

=== Works ===
- Heirmologion by Peter the Peloponnesian
- Short Heirmologion
- Anastasimatarion by Peter the Peloponnesian
- Short Anastasimatarion
- Doxastarion by Peter the Peloponnesian
- Doxastarion by Jacob the Arch-cantor

=== Contribution ===
Due to this teaching and his work in the area of chanting, as well and his copying and explanations of older works, Peter the Byzantine remains one of the most important musicians in the second great period of prosperity (1770–1820) of the new church chanting.
