= Nafpliotis =

Nafpliotis (Greek: Ναυπλιώτης) is a Greek surname which means "descending from Nafplio" (toponymic surname). The female equivalent is Nafpliotou (Greek: Ναυπλιώτου. Notable people with the surname include:

- Iakovos Nafpliotis (1864–1942), the Archon Protopsaltis of the Holy and Great Church of Christ in Constantinople
- Ioannis Nafpliotis (born 1970), Greek sprinter
- Maria Nafpliotou (born 1969), Greek actress
