= Stanitsas =

Stanitsas may refer to:

- The English plural form of the word stanitsa, a historical type of village in the Russian Empire
- Thrasyvoulos Stanitsas (1910–1987), Greek religious singer
