= Thrasyvoulos Stanitsas =

Thrasyvoulos Stanitsas (Greek: Θρασύβουλος Στανίτσας; 1910–1987) was a protopsaltes (leading cantor) in the Great Church of Constantinople from 1960 until 1964. In this position, he succeeded Konstantinos Pringos.

== Musical career ==
Stanitsas became a lampadarius for Pringos in 1939. At that time he also received tutoring from Anastasios Michaelides, who served as a First Domestikos for Iakovos Nafpliotis. In 1960 he succeeded Pringos as "Archon Protopsaltes" for the Ecumenical Patriarchate.

In 1964, Stanitsas was expelled from Turkey by the Turkish authorities, along with many other Greeks living in Constantinople. He lived and chanted on the island of Chios for a year, moved to Beirut, and finally chanted in Athens in the church of St Demetrios from 1966 until his retirement in 1981.

== Legacy ==
Although the first recordings of the Patriarchal School of Byzantine chant were made by Iakovos Nafpliotis, and some recordings exist of Konstantinos Pringos, Thrasyvoulos Stanitsas was the first Patriarchal style chanter to be recorded extensively, in some cases with professional studio quality. As a result, chanters in modern practice who prefer orienting to the Patriarchal school of chant base their performances primarily on recordings and interpretations of Stanitsas, sometimes to the extent of attempting to copy his personal style. The "Stanitsas school" may thus be called one of two most recognizable schools of Byzantine chanting, the other being the Simon Karas school.
