= George Rhaedestenos II =

Greek musicologist and singer

- Γεώργιος Ραιδεστηνός Β΄
- Portrait of George Rhaedestenos II.
- Born: 1833; Rhaedestus, Ottoman Empire
- Died: 1889; Constantinople, Ottoman Empire
- Occupation: cantor

Lambadarios of Ecumenical Patriarchate
- In office 1863–1871

Arch-cantor of Ecumenical Patriarchate
- In office 1871–1875

George Rhaedestenos II (Greek: Γεώργιος Ραιδεστηνός Β΄; Georgios Rhaeestenos II; 1833 in Rhaedestus – 1889 in Constantinople) was acting Lambadarios of the Ecumenical Patriarchate of Constantinople, when Stephen the Lambadarios was old and weak. He was an unimmitable performer of psaltic art, and second to none of his contemporary cantors; he was especially renowned for his ancient-like patriarchal chanting style.

== Biography ==
He was born in 1833 at Rhaedestus, where his first learned music; but later became proficient in Constantinople by the Archcantor of the Great Church Constantine Byzantios, at the proposal of the retired in Antigone former Patriarch of Constantinople Constantine I from Sinai.

He served as a cantor in various churches of the Greek Orthodox Archbishopric of Constantinople. In 1863, under Patriarch Sophronios III, he was made Lambadarios of the Great Church, when Archcantor was John Byzantios. On 2 February 1871, under the patriarchy of Gregory VI, he became Archcantor in succession of Savrakes Gregoriades. He stayed at this service until 1875.

In October 1876, he retired from the patriarchate and lead the choir of the church of St John of Chios in Galata, of St. Nicholas and the Saviour Christ, the church of the Holy Trinity at Peran, and towards the end of his life in the church of St. Nicholas at Tzivali.

For four years (1880 to 1884), he presided over the Hellenic Musical Association, which was based in Galata, and directed and taught at this Musical School (1882). He had few, but distinguished students. He died at Constantinople in August 1889.

== Works ==
George Rhaedestenos II beautified and metered all the lessons of the yearly service. He composed several hymns which stand out for their honey-sweetness. He published two music books, in which one can find the chanted services of the Holy Week and the Pentecostarion together with remarks from the Typikon.

Some of his beautiful hymns were published in the "Music compilation" by Demetrios Kyphiotes (1894), and by Agathangellos Kyriazides in the 1896 book "One blossom for our church music", as well as in "Forminga" an Athenian musical newspaper.
