= Thrasyvoulos =

Thrasyvoulos is a given name. People with the name include:

- Thrasyvoulos Stanitsas
- Thrasyvoulos Tsakalotos
- Thrasyvoulos Zaimis
- Thrasyvoulos Manos

== See also ==
- Thrasyvoulos F.C.
