= Konstantinos Pringos =

Konstantinos Pringos (1892 in Constantinople – 1964 in Athens) was a protopsaltes (leading cantor) in the Great Church of Constantinople from 1939 until 1959. In this position, he succeeded Iakovos Nafpliotis, while Pringos himself was in turn succeeded by Thrasyvoulos Stanitsas.

Although the oldest existing recordings of the Patriarchal School of Byzantine chant are the 78 rpm Gramophone records of Iakovos Nafpliotis, Pringos was the first to be recorded performing live in the church, in a normal tempo, and with a "standard" completeness of interpretations (unlike the gramophone recordings of Nafpliotis that are known to be slower and simpler than his normal style of chanting). As a result of that, Pringos (together with Thrasyvoulos Stanitsas) is the main source of information and inspiration for those trying to chant in the Patriarchal Style. The other reason why the recordings of Pringos might be preferred to that of Stanitsas, is that Pringos was substantially more conservative, and so closer to the original chanting tradition of the Ecumenical Patriarchate. The melodies Pringos used for those parts of the service that were not notated traditionally (such as the responses to the supplications) are also widely used in current practice as exemplary models.
