= Psaltis =

Psaltis (Greek: Ψάλτης) is a surname. Notable people with the surname include:

- Dawn Marie Psaltis (born 1970), American actress and wrestler
- Demetri Psaltis (born 1953), Greek-American electrical engineer
- Edward Psaltis (born 1961), Australian yachtsman
- Iakovos Psaltis (born 1935), Greek weightlifter
- Jim Psaltis (1927–2017), American football player
- Paris Psaltis (born 1996), Cypriot football player
- Stathis Psaltis (1948–2017), Greek actor

== See also ==
- Cantor (Christianity)
