= Nileas Kamarados =

Greek singer

Nileas Kamarados (Greek: Νηλέας Καμαράδος,1847 in Bosporus – 1922 in Istanbul), his father, Antonis, and his grandfather, Constantinos, escaped the massacre of Chios and set up a trading empire in Russia. They later returned to Asia Minor. He was an influential cantor in Byzantine music and invented his own notational system based on the Byzantine and Armenian systems his tutors taught him.

Kamarados had a number of pupils who were relatively older Constantinoplitan chanters, including Vafeiadis, Themistoklis Georgiadis, Bekiaris, and Papadopoulos. In particular, Georgiadis' hand-written Syllogi Ekklisiastikon Asmaton and his 1934 book Neon Doxastarion were based on Kamarados' method of notation.
