= Bisanthe =

Ancient city of Thrace

Coordinates: 40°59′00″N 27°31′00″E

Bisanthe (Ancient Greek: Βισάνθη) was a great city in ancient Thrace, on the coast of the Propontis, which had been founded by the Samians. About 400 BCE, Bisanthe belonged to the kingdom of the Thracian prince Seuthes II. At a later period its name was changed into Raedestum, Rhaedestum or Rhaideston (Ῥαίδεστον), or Raedestus, Rhaedestus or Rhaidestos (Ῥαίδεστος); but when this change took place is unknown. In the 6th century CE, the emperor Justinian did much to restore the city, which seems to have fallen into decay; but after that time it was twice destroyed by the Bulgarians, first in 813, and a second time in 1206. The further history of this city, which was of great importance to Byzantium, was covered by Byzantine historians George Pachymeres and Cantacuzenus. It is generally believed that the town of Resistos or Resisto, mentioned by Pliny the Elder, and in the Antonine Itinerary, is the same as Bisanthe; but Pliny mentions Bisanthe and Resistos as distinct towns. Coins minted by Bisanthe survive. Under the name Rhaedestus, it remains a titular see of the Roman Catholic Church.

Its site is near the modern town of Tekirdağ.
