= Cherubikon =

Byzantine hymn

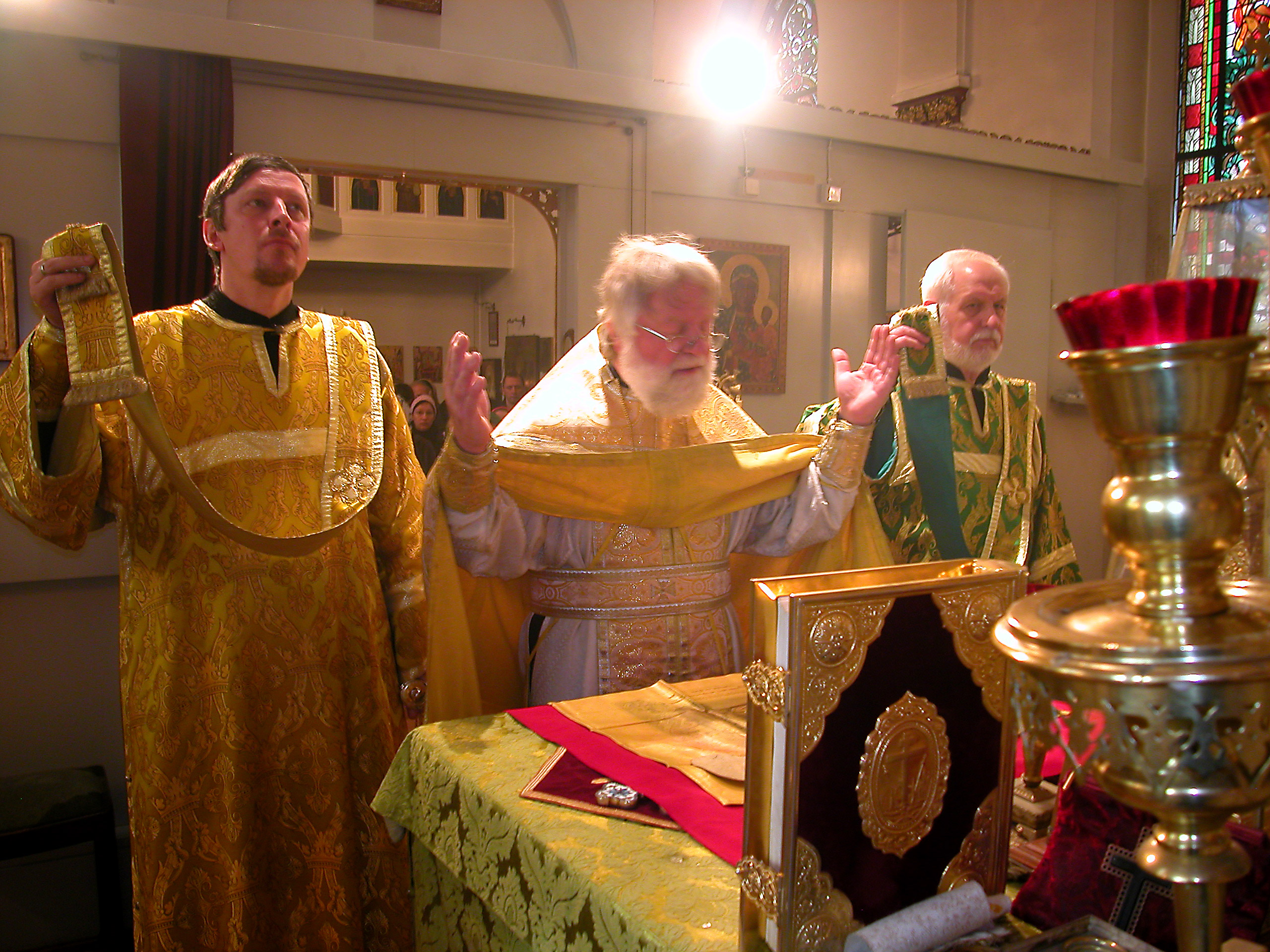
Orthodox priest and deacons praying the Cherubic Hymn at the beginning of the Great Entrance

The Cherubikon (Greek: χερουβικόν) is the usual Cherubic Hymn (Greek: χερουβικὸς ὕμνος, Church Slavonic Херуви́мская песнь) sung at the Great Entrance of the Byzantine liturgy.

== History ==
=== Origin ===
The cherubikon was added as a troparion to the Divine Liturgy under Emperor Justin II (565–578) when a separation of the room where the gifts are prepared from the room where they are consecrated made it necessary that the Liturgy of the Faithful, from which those not baptised had been excluded, start with a procession. This procession is known as the Great Entrance, because the celebrants have to enter the choir by the altar screen, later replaced by the iconostasis. The hymn symbolically incorporates those present at the liturgy into the presence of the angels gathered around God's throne. The chant genre offertorium in traditions of Western plainchant was basically a copy of the Byzantine custom, but there it was a proper mass chant which changed regularly.

Although its liturgical concept already existed by the end of the 4th century (see the homily by Chrysostom quoted here), the cherubikon itself was created 200 years later due to a change in sacred architecture. The Great Entrance as a ritual act is needed for a procession with the Gifts while simultaneous prayers and ritual acts are performed by the clergy. As the processional troparion, the cherubikon has to bridge the long way between prothesis, a room to north of the central apse, and the sanctuary which had been separated by changes in sacred architecture under Emperor Justin II. The cherubikon is divided into several parts. The first part is sung before the celebrant begins his prayers, there were one or two simultaneous parts, and they all followed like a gradual ascent in different steps within the Great Entrance. Verses 2-5 were sung by a soloist (in Medieval Greek: μονοφωνάρης, romanized: monofonaris, lit. '"single voice"') from the ambo.

=== Liturgical use ===
Concerning the text of the processional troparion which was ascribed to Justin II, it is not entirely clear, whether "thrice-holy hymn" did refer to the Sanctus of the Anaphora or to another hymn of the 5th century known as the trisagion in Constantinople, but also in other liturgical traditions like the Latin Gallican and Milanese rites. Concerning the old custom of Constantinople, the trisagion was used as a troparion of the third antiphonon at the beginning of the divine liturgy as well as of hesperinos. In the West, there were liturgical customs in Spain and France, where the trisagion replaced the great doxology during the Holy Mass on lesser feasts.

The troparion of the great entrance (at the beginning of the second part of the divine liturgy which excluded the catechumens) was also the prototype of the genre offertorium in Western plainchant, although its text only appears in the particular custom of the Missa graeca celebrated on Pentecost and during the patronal feast of the Royal Abbey of Saint Denis, after the latter's vita became associated with Pseudo-Dionysios Areopagites. According to the local bilingual custom the hymn was sung both in Greek and in Latin translation.

Today, the separation of the prothesis is part of the early history of the Constantinopolitan rite (akolouthia asmatike). With respect to the Constantinopolitan customs there are many different local customs in Orthodox communities all over the world and there are urban and monastic choir traditions in different languages into which the cherubikon has been translated.

=== Exegetic tradition of Isaiah ===
The trisagion or thrice-holy hymn which was mentioned by John Chrysostom, could only refer to the Sanctus of the Anaphora taken from the Old Testament, from the book of the prophet Isaiah in particular (6:1-3):

Ancient Greek	English
[1] Καὶ ἐγένετο τοῦ ἐνιαυτοῦ, οὗ ἀπέθανεν Ὀζίας ὁ βασιλεύς, εἶδον τὸν κύριον καθήμενον ἐπὶ θρόνου ὑψηλοῦ καὶ ἐπηρμένου, καὶ πλήρης ὁ οἶκος τῆς δόξης αὐτοῦ. [2] καὶ σεραφὶμ εἱστήκεισαν κύκλῳ αὐτοῦ, ἓξ πτέρυγες τῷ ἑνὶ καὶ ἓξ πτέρυγες τῷ ἑνί, καὶ ταῖς μὲν δυσὶν κατεκάλυπτον τὸ πρόσωπον καὶ ταῖς δυσὶν κατεκάλυπτον τοὺς πόδας καὶ ταῖς δυσὶν ἐπέταντο. [3] καὶ ἐκέκραγον ἕτερος πρὸς τὸν ἕτερον καὶ ἔλεγον Ἅγιος ἅγιος ἅγιος κύριος σαβαώθ, πλήρης πᾶσα ἡ γῆ τῆς δόξης αὐτοῦ.	[1] And it came to pass in the year in which king Ozias died, that I saw the Lord sitting on a high and exalted throne, and the house was full of his glory. [2] And seraphs stood round about him, each one had six wings, and with two they covered their face, and with two they covered their feet, and with two they flew. [3] And one cried to the other, and they said "Holy, holy, holy is the Lord of hosts! The whole earth is full of His glory!"

In a homily John Chrysostom interpreted Isaiah and the chant of the divine liturgy in general (neither the cherubikon nor the trisagion existed in his time) as an analogue act which connected the community with the eternal angelic choirs:

Ancient Greek	English
Ἄνω στρατιαὶ δοξολογοῦσιν ἀγγέλων· κᾶτω ἐν ἐκκλησίαις χοροστατοῦντες ἄνθρωποι τὴν αὐτὴν ἐκείνοις ἐκμιμοῦνται δοξολογίαν. Ἄνω τὰ Σεραφὶμ τὸν τρισάγιον ὕμνον ἀναβοᾷ· κάτω τὸν αὑτὸν ἠ τῶν ἀνθρώπων ἀναπέμπει πληθύς· κοινὴ τῶν ἐπουρανίων καὶ τῶν ἐπιγείων συγκροτεῖται πανήγυρις· μία εὐχαριστία, ἓν ἀγαλλίαμα, μία εὐφρόσυνος χοροστασία.	On high, the armies of angels give glory; below, men, standing in church forming a choir, emulate the same doxologies. Above, the Seraphim declaim the thrice-holy hymn; below, the multitude of men sends up the same. A common festival of the heavenly and the earthly is celebrated together; one Eucharist, one exultation, one joyful choir.

=== The anti-cherubika ===
The cherubikon belongs to the ordinary mass chant of the divine liturgy ascribed to John Chrysostom, because it has to be sung during the year cycle, however, it is sometimes substituted by other troparia, the so-called "anti-cherubika", when other formularies of the divine liturgy are celebrated. On Holy Thursday, for example, the cherubikon was, and still is, replaced by the troparion "At your mystical supper" (Τοῦ δείπνου σου τοῦ μυστικοῦ) according to the liturgy of Saint Basil, while during the Liturgy of the Presanctified the troparion "Now the powers of the heavens" (Νῦν αἱ δυνάμεις τῶν οὐρανῶν) was sung, and the celebration of Prote Anastasis (Holy Saturday) uses the troparion from the Liturgy of St. James, "Let All Mortal Flesh Keep Silence" (Σιγησάτω πᾶσα σὰρξ βροτεία). The latter troparion is also used occasionally at the consecration of a church.

== Text ==
In the current traditions of Orthodox chant, its Greek text is not only sung in older translations such as the one in Old Church Slavonic or in Georgian, but also in Romanian and other modern languages.

In the Greek text, the introductory clauses are participial, and the first person plural becomes apparent only with the verb ἀποθώμεθα "let us lay aside". The Slavonic translation mirrors this closely, while most other translations introduce a finite verb in the first person plural already in the first line (Latin imitamur, Georgian vemsgavsebit, Romanian închipuim "we imitate, represent").

Greek
Οἱ τὰ χερουβὶμ μυστικῶς εἰκονίζοντες
καὶ τῇ ζωοποιῷ τριάδι τὸν τρισάγιον ὕμνον προσᾴδοντες
πᾶσαν τὴν βιωτικὴν ἀποθώμεθα μέριμναν
Ὡς τὸν βασιλέα τῶν ὅλων ὑποδεξόμενοι
ταῖς ἀγγελικαῖς ἀοράτως δορυφορούμενον τάξεσιν
ἀλληλούϊα ἀλληλούϊα ἀλληλούϊα

10th-century Latin transliteration of the Greek text
I ta cherubin mysticos Iconizontes
ke ti zopion triadi ton trisagyon ymnon prophagentes
passa nin biotikin apothometa merinnan
Os ton basileon ton olon Ipodoxomeni
tes angelikes aoraton doriforumenon taxasin
alleluia.

Latin
Qui cherubin mystice imitamur
et vivifice trinitati ter sanctum ymnum offerimus
Omnem nunc mundanam deponamus sollicitudinem
Sicuti regem omnium suscepturi
Cui ab angelicis invisibiliter ministratur ordinibus
A[LL]E[L]UIA

English translation
We who mystically represent the Cherubim,
and who sing to the Life-Giving Trinity the thrice-holy hymn,
let us now lay aside all earthly cares
that we may receive the King of all,
escorted invisibly by the angelic orders.
Alleluia

Church Slavonic

ї҆́же херꙋвї́мы та́йнѡ ѡ҆бразꙋ́юще,
и҆ Животворѧ́щей тро́ицѣ Трисвѧтꙋ́ю пѣ́снь припѣва́юще,
всѧ́кое ны́нѣ жите́йское ѿложи́мъ попече́нїе.
Ꙗ҆́кѡ да царѧ̀ всѣ́хъ подымемъ,
ангельскими неви́димѡ дорѷноси́ма чи́нми.
Аллилꙋ́іа

Transliterated Church Slavonic
Íže heruvímy tájnō ōbrazujúšte,
i životvoręštej Tróicě trisvętúju pěsňĭ pripěvájúšte,
Vsęko[j]e nýňě žitéjsko[j]e otložimŭ popečenìe.
Jákō da Carę vsěhŭ podŭimemŭ,
ángelĭskimi nevídimō dorỳnosíma čínmi.
Allilúia

Georgian
რომელნი ქერუბიმთა საიდუმლოსა ვემსგავსებით,
და ცხოველსმყოფელისა სამებისა, სამგზის წმიდასა გალობასა შენდა შევწირავთ,
ყოველივე აწ სოფლისა დაუტეოთ ზრუნვა.
და ვითარცა მეუფისა ყოველთასა,
შემწყნარებელსა ანგელოსთაებრ უხილავად, ძღვნის შემწირველთა წესთასა.
ალილუია, ალილუია, ალილუია.

Transliterated Georgian
romelni qerubimta saidumlosa vemsgavsebit,
da tskhovelsmq'opelisa samebisa, samgzis ts'midasa galobasa shenda shevts'iravt,
q'ovelive ats' soplisa daut'eot zrunva.
da vitartsa meupisa q'oveltasa,
shemts'q'narebelsa angelostaebr ukhilavad, dzghvnis shemts'irvelta ts'estasa.
aliluia, aliluia, aliluia

Romanian
Noi, care pe heruvimi cu taină închipuim,
Şi făcătoarei de viaţă Treimi întreit-sfântă cântare aducem,
Toată grija cea lumească să o lepădăm.
Ca pe Împăratul tuturor, să primim,
Pe Cel înconjurat în chip nevăzut de cetele îngereşti.
Aliluia, aliluia, aliluia.

== The notated chant sources ==
Due to the destruction of Byzantine music manuscripts, especially after 1204, when Western crusaders expelled the traditional cathedral rite from Constantinople, the chant of the cherubikon appears quite late in the musical notation of the monastic reformers, within liturgical manuscripts not before the late 12th century. This explains the paradox, why the earliest notated sources which have survived until now, are of Carolingian origin. They document the Latin reception of the cherubikon, where it is regarded as the earliest prototype of the mass chant genre offertorium, although there is no real procession of the gifts.

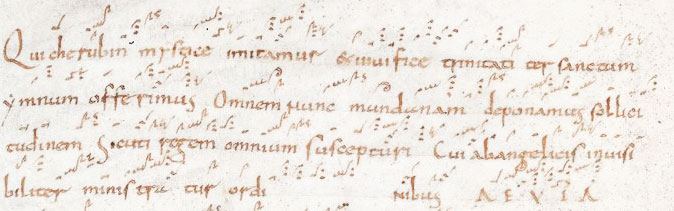
Latin cherubikon (early 11th century) added to a 10th-century anthology dedicated to Boethius (GB-Lbl Ms. Harley 3095, f. 111v)

=== The Latin cherubikon of the "Missa greca" ===
The oldest source survived is a sacramentary ("Hadrianum") with the so-called "Missa greca" which was written at or for the liturgical use at a Stift of canonesses (Essen near Aachen). The transliterated cherubikon in the center like the main parts of the Missa greca were notated with paleofrankish neumes between the text lines. Paleofrankish neumes are adiastematic and no manuscripts with the Latin cherubikon have survived in diastematic neumes. Nevertheless, it is supposed to be a melos of an E mode like the earliest Byzantine cherubika which have the main intonation of echos plagios deuteros.

In this particular copy of the Hadrianum the "Missa greca" was obviously intended as proper mass chant for Pentecost, because the cherubikon was classified as offertorium and followed by the Greek Sanctus, the convention of the divine liturgy, and finally by the communio "Factus est repente", the proper chant of Pentecost. Other manuscripts belonged to the Abbey Saint-Denis, where the Missa greca was celebrated during Pentecost and in honour of the patron within the festal week (octave) dedicated to him. Sacramentaries without musical notation transliterated the Greek text of the cherubikon into Latin characters, while the books of Saint-Denis with musical notation translated the text of the troparion into Latin. Only the Hadrianum of Essen or Korvey provided the Greek text with notation and served obviously to prepare cantors who did not know Greek very well.

=== The cherubikon asmatikon ===
In the tradition of the cathedral rite of the Hagia Sophia, there was only one melody in the E mode (echos plagios devteros, echos devteros), which has survived in the Asmatika (choir books) and, in a complete form, as "cherouvikon asmatikon" in the books Akolouthiai of the 14th and 15th century.

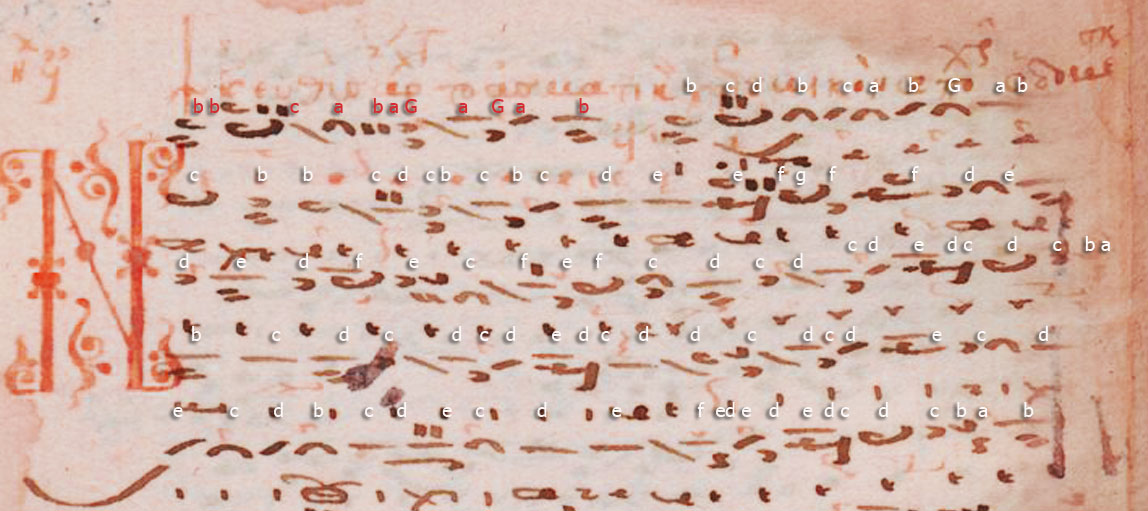
Beginning of the cherubikon asmatikon in echos plagios devteros with medial enechema Νεανες of echos devteros, Akolouthiai manuscript about 1400 (A-Wn Theol. gr. 185, f. 255v)

In this later elaboration, the domestikos, leader of the right choir, sings an intonation, and the right choir performs the beginning until μυστικῶς. Then the domestikos intervenes with a kalopismos over the last syllable το—το and a teretismos (τε—ρι—ρεμ). The choir concludes the kolon with the last word εἰκονίζοντες. The left choir is replaced by a soloist, called "Monophonaris" (μονοφωνάρις), presumably the lampadarios or leader of the left choir. He sings the rest of the text from an ambo. Then the allelouia (ἀλληλούϊα) is performed with a long final teretismos by the choir and the domestikos.

The earlier asmatika of the 13th century only contain those parts sung by the choir and the domestikos. These asmatic versions of the cherubikon are not identical, but composed realizations, sometimes even the name of the cantor was indicated. Only one manuscript, a 14th-century anthology of the asma, has survived in the collection of the Archimandritate Santissimo Salvatore of Messina (I-ME Cod. mess. gr. 161) with the part of the psaltikon. It provides a performance of the monophonaris together with acclamations or antiphona in honour of the Sicilian King Frederick II and can be dated back to his time.

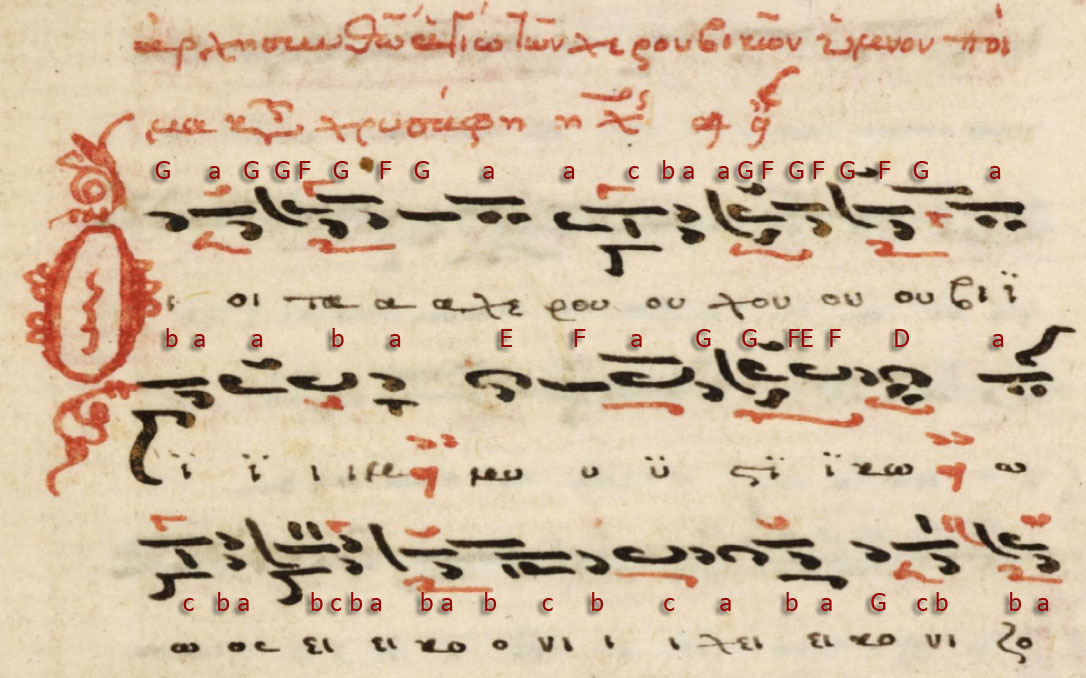
Manuel Chrysaphes' cherubikon in the papadic echos protos, transcribed according to Panagiotes the New Chrysaphes (GB-Lbl Ms. Harley 5544, f. 131v)

=== The cherubikon palatinon ===
Another shorter version, composed in the echos plagios devteros without any teretismoi, inserted sections with abstract syllables, was still performed during celebrations of the imperial court of Constantinople by the choir during the 14th century. A longer elaboration of the cherubikon palatinon attributed to "John Koukouzeles" was transcribed and printed in the chant books used by protopsaltes today.

=== Papadic cherubikon cycles ===
Today the common practice is to perform the cherubikon according to the echos of the week (octoechos). One of the earliest sources with an octoechos cycle is an Akolouthiai manuscript by Manuel Chrysaphes (GR-AOi Ms. 1120) written in 1458. He had composed and written down an own cycle of 8 cherubika in the papadic melos of the octoechos.

Until the present day the protopsaltes at the Patriarchate of Constantinople are expected to contribute their own realization of the papadic cycles. Because the length of the cherubikon was originally adapted to the ritual procession, the transcriptions of the print editions according to the New Method are distinct between three cycles. A short one for the week days (since the divine liturgy became a daily service), a longer one for Sundays, and an elaborated one for festival occasions, when a bishop or abbot joined the procession.
