= Kontakion =

Form of hymn in the Byzantine liturgical tradition

A kontakion (Greek κοντάκιον, kondákion, plural κοντάκια, kondákia) is a form of hymn in the Byzantine liturgical tradition. The kontakion form originated in Syriac hymnography and gained prominence in Byzantium during the 6th century, particularly through the work of St. Romanos the Melodist of Emesa. Kontakia have a number of strophes (oikoi or ikoi, stanzas; singular oikos or ikos) and begin with a prologue (the prooimoion or koukoulion). A kontakion sometimes has a biblical theme and may feature a dialogue between biblical characters. The only kontakion that is used in full length today is the Akathist to the Theotokos.

== Etymology ==
The word kontakion derives from the Greek κόνταξ (kóntax), which means "rod" or "stick" and refers specifically to the rod around which a scroll is wound. While the genre dates to at least the 6th century, the word itself is attested only in the 9th century. The name is likely a reference to the fact that kontakions tend to be lengthy and have a large number of stanzas, thus metaphorically or literally requiring a great deal of "scrolling".

A hymn book containing kontakia is called a kontakarion (κοντακάριον; loaned into Slavonic as kondakar, Church Slavonic: кондакарь), but a kontakarion is not just a collection of kontakia: in the tradition of the Cathedral Rite (like that practiced at the Hagia Sophia of Constantinople) this became the name of the book of the prechanter or lampadarios, also known as psaltikon, which contained all the soloistic parts of hymns sung during the morning service and the Divine Liturgy. Because the kontakia were usually sung by protopsaltes during the morning services, the first part for the morning service with its prokeimena and kontakia was the most voluminous part, and acquired the name kontakarion.

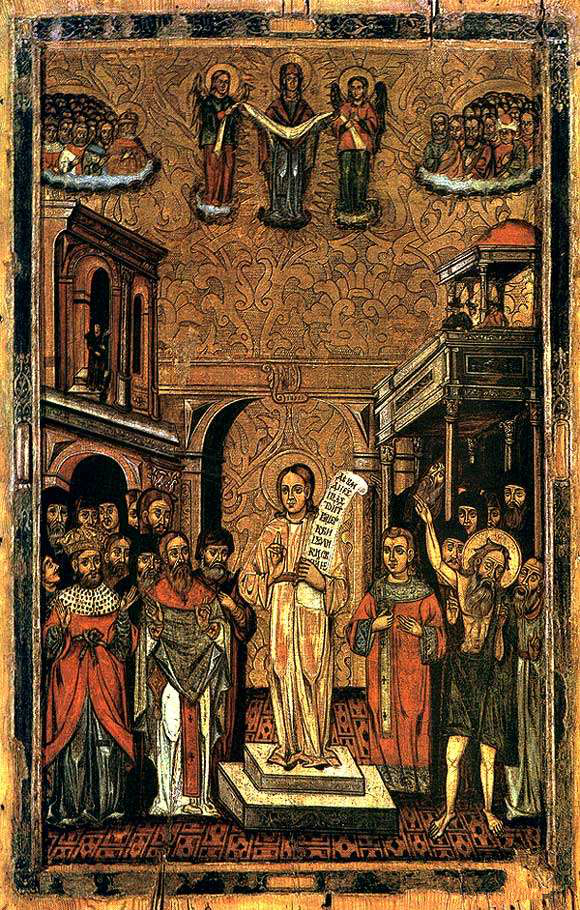
Icon of St. Romanos the Melodist chanting his kontakion (1649, Malaryta, Belarus)

== History ==
Originally the kontakion was a Syriac form of poetry, achieving popularity in Constantinople first under Romanos the Melodist, Anastasios, and Kyriakos in the 6th century, and then under Sergius I of Constantinople and Sophronius of Jerusalem in the 7th century. Romanos' works had been widely acknowledged as a crucial contribution to Byzantine hymnography, in some kontakia he also supported Emperor Justinian by writing state propaganda.

Romanos' kontakion On the Nativity of Christ was also mentioned in his vita. Until the twelfth century, it was sung every year at the imperial banquet on that feast by the joint choirs of Hagia Sophia and of the Church of the Holy Apostles in Constantinople. Most of the poem takes the form of a dialogue between the Mother of God and the Magi.

A kontakion is a poetic form frequently encountered in Byzantine hymnography. It was probably based on Syriac hymnographical traditions, which were transformed and developed in Greek-speaking Byzantium. It was a homiletic genre and could be best described as a "sermon in verse accompanied by music". In character it is similar to the early Byzantine festival sermons in prose — a genre developed by Ephrem the Syrian — but meter and music have greatly heightened the drama and rhetorical beauty of the speaker's often profound and very rich meditation.

Medieval manuscripts preserved about 750 kontakia since the 9th century, about two thirds had been composed since the 10th century, but they were rather liturgical compositions with about two or six oikoi, each one concluded by a refrain identical to the introduction (prooimion). Longer compositions were the Slavic Akafist which were inspired by an acrostic kontakion whose 24 stanzas started with each letter of the alphabet (Akathist).

Within the cathedral rite developed a truncated form which reduced the kontakion to one oikos or just to the prooimion, while the music was elaborated to a melismatic style. The classical repertoire consisted of 42 kontakia-idiomela, and 44 kontakia-prosomoia made about a limited number of model stanzas consisting of fourteen prooimia-idiomela and thirteen okoi-idiomela which could be combined independently. This classical repertoire was dominated by classical composers of the 6th and 7th centuries.

== Form ==
The form generally consists of 18 to 24 metrically identical stanzas called oikoi (lit. "houses"), preceded, in a different meter, by a short prelude called a koukoulion (cowl) or prooimoion. The first letters of each of the stanzas often form an acrostic, which frequently includes the name of the poet. For example, Romanos' poems often include the acrostic "Of the Humble Romanos" or "The Poem of the Humble Romanos". The last line of the prelude introduces a refrain called "ephymnion", which is repeated at the end of all the stanzas.

The main body of a kontakion was chanted from the ambo by a cleric (often a deacon; otherwise a reader) after the reading of the Gospel, while a choir, or even the whole congregation, joined in the refrain. The length of many kontakia — indeed, the epic character of some — suggest that the majority of the text must have been delivered in a kind of recitative rather than having music composed for every word, but unfortunately the original music to the kontakia has not survived.

== The liturgical place of the kontakion ==
Within the cathedral rite, the ritual context of the long kontakion was the pannychis during solemn occasions (a festive night vigil) and was usually celebrated at the Blachernae Chapel. Assumptions that kontakia replaced canon poetry or vice versa that the Stoudites replaced the kontakia with Hagiopolitan canon poetry, always remained controversial. The Patriarch Germanus I of Constantinople established an own local school earlier (even if it is no longer present in the modern books), while the Stoudites embraced the genre kontakion with own new compositions. The only explanation is that different customs must have existed simultaneously, the truncated and the long kontakion, but also the ritual context of both customs.

The truncated form consists only of the first stanza called "koukoulion" (now referred to as simply "the kontakion") and the first oikos, while the other oikoi became omitted. Within the Orthros for the kontakion and oikos is after the sixth ode of the canon; however, if the typikon for the day calls for more than one kontakion at matins, the kontakion and oikos of the more significant feast is sung after the sixth ode, while those of the less significant feast are transferred to the place following the third ode, before the kathismata.

Since the late 13th century, when the Court and the Patriarchate returned from exile in Nikaia, the former cathedral rite was not continued and thus, also the former celebration of kontakion changed. The only entire kontakion celebrated was the Akathist hymn. Its original place was within the menaion the feast of Annunciation (25 March). In later kontakaria and oikemataria which treated all 24 oikoi in a kalophonic way, the Akathist was written as part of the triodion, within the oikematarion the complete kontakion filled half the volume of the whole book. As such it could only be performed in short sections throughout Great Lent and became a kind of para-liturgical genre. In the modern practice it is reduced to heirmologic melos which allowed the celebration of the whole Akathist on the morning service of the fourth Sunday of Great Lent. This Akathist was traditionally ascribed to Romanos, but recent scholarship has disapproved it. In Slavic hymnography the so-called Akafist became a genre of its own which was dedicated to various saints; while not part of any prescribed service, these may be prayed as a devotional hymn at any time.

The current practice treats the kontakion as a proper troparion, based on the text of the prooimion, dedicated to a particular feast of the menaion or the moveable cycle.

== Prooimia of 4 classical kontakia ==
The examples chosen here are only the introduction (prooimion, koukoulion) and they belong to the old core repertoire of 86 kontakia which had been all known as part of the cathedral rite. Thus, they can be found with notation in the kontakarion-psaltikon.

According to the melodic system of the cathedral rite, certain kontakia-idiomela served as melodic models used to compose other kontakia. The kontakion for Easter for instance was used to compose an Old Church Slavonic kondak in honour of the local saints Boris and Gleb, two martyre princes of the Kievan Rus. The concluding verse called "ephymnion" (ἐφύμνιον) was repeated like a refrain after each oikos and its melody was used in all kontakia composed in the ēchos plagios tetartos.

Kontakion of Pascha (Easter)

The Slavic kondakar has the old gestic notation which referred (in the first row) to the hand signs used by the choirleaders to coordinate the singers. Except for the ephymnion the whole prooimion and the oikoi were recited by a soloist called "monophonaris" (the hand sign were not so important than during the ephymnion). The Middle Byzantine notation used in the Greek kontakarion-psaltikon rather showed the melismatic melos behind these signs.

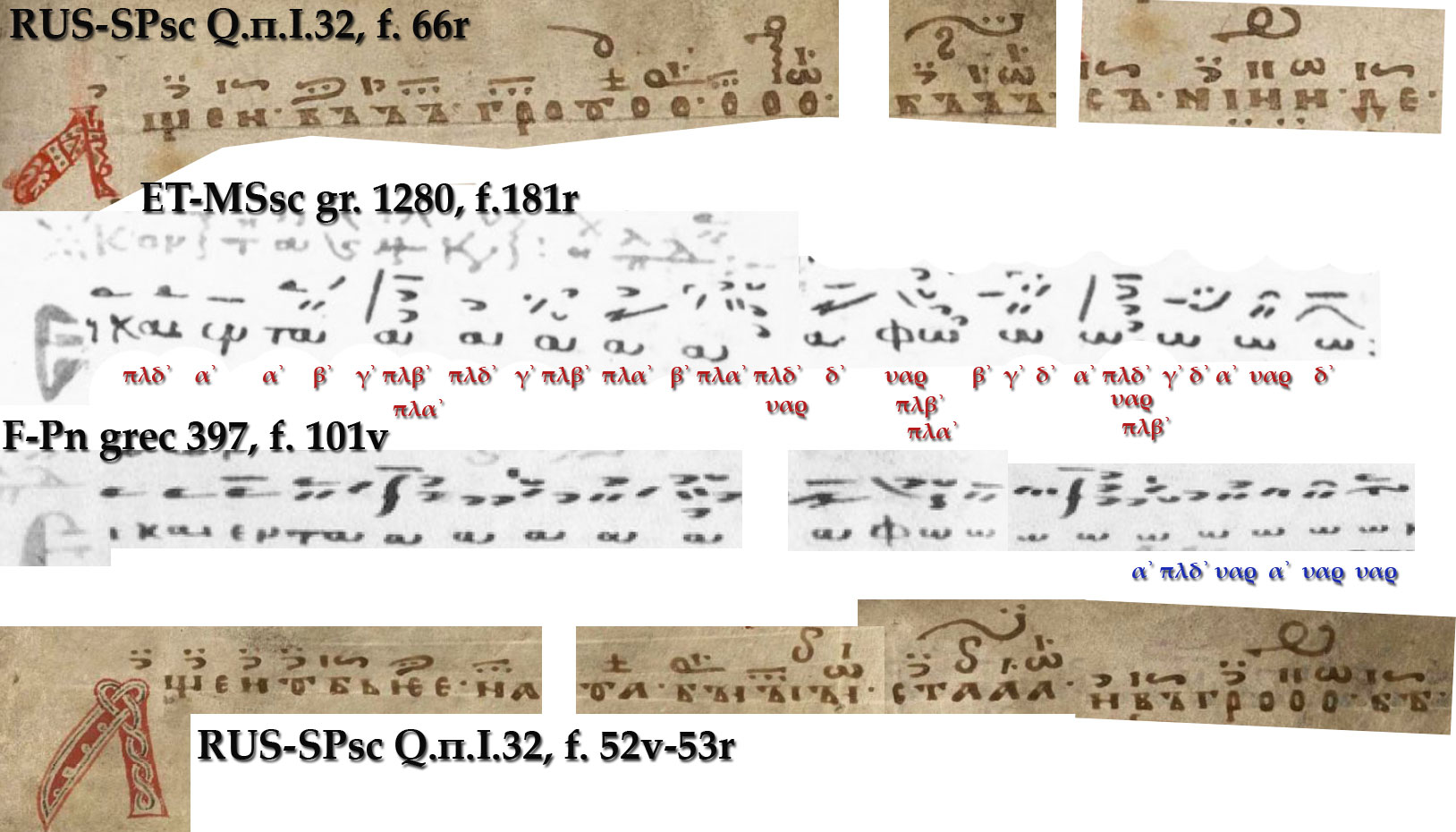
Easter kondak Аще и въ гробъ Ašte i vǔ grobǔ (Easter kontakion Εἰ καὶ ἐν τάφῳ Ei kai en taphō) in ēchos plagios tetartos and its kontakion-prosomoion Аще и убьѥна быста Ašte i ubǐjena bysta (24 July Boris and Gleb) (RUS-SPsc Ms. Q.п.I.32, ET-MSsc Ms. Sin. Gr. 1280, F-Pn fonds grec Ms. 397)

Εἰ καὶ ἐν τάφῳ κατῆλθες ἀθάνατε,
ἀλλὰ τοῦ ᾍδου καθεῖλες
τὴν δύναμιν, καὶ ἀνέστης ὡς νικητής, Χριστὲ ὁ Θεός,
γυναιξὶ Μυροφόροις φθεγξάμενος.
Χαίρετε, καὶ τοῖς σοῖς Ἀποστόλοις εἰρήνην
δωρούμενος ὁ τοῖς πεσοῦσι παρέχων ἀνάστασιν.

Аще и въ гробъ съниде бесъмьртьне
нъ адѹ раздрѹши силѹ
и въскрьсе ꙗко побѣдителъ христе боже
женамъ мюроносицѧмъ радость провѣща
и своимъ апостолѡмъ миръ дарова
падъшимъ подаꙗ въскрьсениѥ

Though Thou didst descend into the grave, O Immortal One,
yet didst Thou destroy the power of Hades,
and didst arise as victory, O Christ God,
calling to the myrrh-bearing women:
Rejoice! and giving peace unto Thine apostles,
Thou Who dost grant resurrection to the fallen.

Another example composed in the same echos is the Akathist hymn, originally provided for the feast of Annunciation (nine months before Nativity).

Kontakion of the Annunciation of the Most Holy Theotokos (25 March)

Τῇ ὑπερμάχῳ στρατηγῷ τὰ νικητήρια,
ὡς λυτρωθεῖσα τῶν δεινῶν εὐχαριστήρια,
ἀναγράφω σοι ἡ πόλις σου, Θεοτόκε·
ἀλλʹ ὡς ἔχουσα τὸ κράτος απροσμάχητον,
ἐκ παντοίων με κινδύνων ἐλευθέρωσον, ἵνα κράζω σοί∙
Χαῖρε Νύμφη ἀνύμφευτε.

Възбраньнѹмѹ воѥводѣ побѣдьнаꙗ
ꙗко избывъ ѿ зълъ благодарениꙗ
въсписаѥть ти градъ твои богородице
нъ ꙗко имѹщи дьржавѹ непобѣдимѹ
ѿ вьсѣхъ мѧ бѣдъ свободи и да зовѹ ти
радѹи сѧ невѣсто неневѣстьнаꙗ.

To thee, the Champion Leader,
we thy servants dedicate a feast of victory
and of thanksgiving as ones rescued out of sufferings, O Theotokos;
but as thou art one with might which is invincible,
from all dangers that can be do thou deliver us, that we may cry to thee:
Rejoice, thou Bride Unwedded.

Kontakion of the Transfiguration of the Lord (6 August)

This kontakion-idiomelon by Romanos the Melodist was composed in echos varys (the grave mode) and the prooimion was chosen as model for the prosomoion of the resurrection kontakion Ἐκ τῶν τοῦ ᾍδου πυλῶν in the same echos.

Ἐπὶ τοῦ ὄρους μετεμορφώθης,
καὶ ὡς ἐχώρουν οἱ Μαθηταί σου,
τὴν δόξαν σου Χριστὲ ὁ Θεὸς ἐθεάσαντο·
ἵνα ὅταν σὲ ἴδωσι σταυρούμενον,
τὸ μὲν πάθος νοήσωσιν ἑκούσιον,
τῷ δὲ κόσμω κηρύξωσιν,
ὅτι σὺ ὑπάρχεις ἀληθῶς, τοῦ Πατρὸς τὸ ἀπαύγασμα.

На горѣ прѣобрази сѧ
и ꙗко въмѣщахѹ ѹченици твои
славѹ твою христе боже видѣша
да ѥгда тѧ ѹзьрѧть распинаѥма
страсть ѹбо разѹмѣють вольнѹю
мирѹ же провѣдѧть
ꙗко ты ѥси въ истинѹ отьче сиꙗниѥ

On the mount Thou was (sic) transfigured,
and Thy disciples, as much as they could bear,
beheld Thy glory, O Christ God;
so that when they should see Thee crucified,
they would know Thy passion to be willing,
and would preach to the world
that Thou, in truth, art the Effulgence of the Father.

Kontakion of the Sunday of the Prodigal Son (9th week before Easter, 2nd week of the triodion)

The last example is not a model, but a kontakion-prosomoion which had been composed over the melody of Romanos the Melodist's Nativity kontakion Ἡ παρθένος σήμερον in echos tritos.

Τῆς πατρῴας, δόξης σου, ἀποσκιρτήσας ἀφρόνως,
ἐν κακοῖς ἐσκόρπισα, ὅν μοι παρέδωκας πλοῦτον·
ὅθεν σοι τὴν τοῦ Ἀσώτου, φωνὴν κραυγάζω·
Ἥμαρτον ἐνώπιόν σου Πάτερ οἰκτίρμον,
δέξαι με μετανοοῦντα, καὶ ποίησόν με, ὡς ἕνα τῶν μισθίων σου.

Having foolishly abandoned Thy paternal glory,
I squandered on vices the wealth which Thou gavest me.
Wherefore, I cry unto Thee with the voice of the Prodigal:
I have sinned before Thee, O compassionate Father.
Receive me as one repentant, and make me as one of Thy hired servants.

== Kontakion of the Departed ==
Perhaps the kontakion which is best known in the west is the Kontakion of the Departed or the Kontakion of the Dead. The text is attributed to the "humble Anastasios", probably a Byzantine monk writing in the 6th or 7th century, although the exact date is a matter of debate. In Russian Orthodox churches, the kontakion is traditionally sung during funerals and memorial services, and on Parents’ Sabbath (Russian Wikipedia article) when the departed are commemorated. It was translated into English from Russian by William John Birkbeck, an English theologian and musicologist who studied Russian church music in Moscow in 1890. The traditional tune, known in English as the Kiev Melody, was edited by Birkbeck's close friend, Sir Walter Parratt, the organist of St George's Chapel, Windsor Castle.

Queen Victoria may have heard this kontakion in Russian at a memorial service in London for the death of Tsar Alexander III in 1894, where she noted that "a fine Russian hymn, always sung at funerals throughout the Greek Church, was sung without accompaniment, & was very impressive". She certainly heard Birkbeck's translation when it was sung at the funeral of Prince Henry of Battenberg in 1896. During the planning of Victoria's state funeral, her daughters asked that the kontakion be included in the service as it was a favourite of their mother's, a suggestion which was blocked by Bishop Randall Davidson with the support of King Edward VII, on the grounds that the text was not in keeping with Anglican teaching on prayers for the dead. Nevertheless, it was sung at the funeral of Queen Alexandra at Westminster Abbey in 1925.

The Kontakion of the Departed with Parratt's arrangement was included in the first edition of The English Hymnal in 1906, and has since appeared in several other Anglican hymn books, including Hymns Ancient and Modern and The Hymnal in the United States. It has been sung at the state and ceremonial funerals of Sir Winston Churchill, Prince Philip, Duke of Edinburgh, and Queen Elizabeth II.

The text of the kontakion is incorporated into the Funeral Service in the Book of Common Prayer (1979), the liturgy currently used by the Episcopal Church in the United States. The words are spoken at state funerals in the United States, for example, the state funeral of Ronald Reagan in 2004 and the state funeral of Gerald Ford in 2006.

In 1971, British composer Benjamin Britten used the Kiev Melody as one of four themes in his Cello Suite No. 3, which he wrote as a present for Russian cellist Mstislav Rostropovich. The American hymnologist, Carl P. Daw Jr., wrote a paraphrase of this kontakion in 1982, Christ the victorious, give to your servants, intended for congregational singing and set to the tune Russian Hymn by Alexei Lvov.

Μετὰ τῶν ἁγίων ἀνάπαυσον, Χριστέ,
τὰς ψυχὰς τῶν δούλων σου ἔνθα οὐκ ἔστι πόνος, οὐ λύπη,
οὐ στεναγμός, ἀλλὰ ζωὴ ἀτελεύτητος: ἀλληλούϊα.

Αὐτὸς μόνος ὑπάρχεις ἀθάνατος ὁ ποιήσας καὶ πλάσας τὸν ἄνθρωπον· οἱ βροτοὶ οὖν ἐκ γῆς διεπλάσθημεν,
καὶ εἰς γῆν τὴν αὐτὴν πορευσόμεθα,
καθὼς ἐκέλευσας ὁ πλάσας με καὶ εἰπών μοι·
Ὅτι γῆ εἶ, καὶ εἰς γῆν ἀπελεύσῃ,
ὅπου πάντες βροτοὶ πορευσόμεθα, ἐπιτάφιον θρῆνον ποιοῦντες ᾠδήν, τό,
Ἀλληλούϊα.

Со святыми упокой, Христе,
души раб Твоих, идеже несть болезнь, ни печаль,
ни воздыхание, но жизнь безконечная.

Сам Един еси Безсмертный, сотворивый и создавый человека:
земнии убо от земли создахомся, и в землю туюжде пойдем,
якоже повелел еси, Создавый мя и рекий ми:
яко земля еси и в землю отыдеши,
аможе вси человецы пойдем, надгробное рыдание творяще песнь:
Аллилуиа, Аллилуиа, Аллилуиа.

Give rest, O Christ,
to thy servant with thy saints,
where sorrow and pain are no more;
neither sighing, but life everlasting.

Thou only art immortal, the Creator and Maker of man;
and we are mortal, formed of the earth, and unto earth shall we return;
for so thou didst ordain when thou createdst me, saying:
'Dust thou art, and unto dust shalt thou return.'
All we go down to the dust, and, weeping o'er the grave we make our song:
Alleluia, alleluia, alleluia.

== Editions ==
- Uspenskiy, Boris Aleksandrovič, ed. (2006). Типографский Устав: Устав с кондакарем конца XI — начала XII века [Tipografsky Ustav: Ustav with Kondakar' end 11th-beginning 12th c. (vol. 1: facsimile, vol. 2: edition of the texts, vol. 3: monographic essays)]. Памятники славяно-русской письменности. Новая серия. Vol. 1–3. Moscow: Языки славянских культур. ISBN 978-5-9551-0131-6.

== See also ==
- Akathist
- Troparion
- Condaghe
