= Cantor (Christianity) =

Chief singer employed at a church

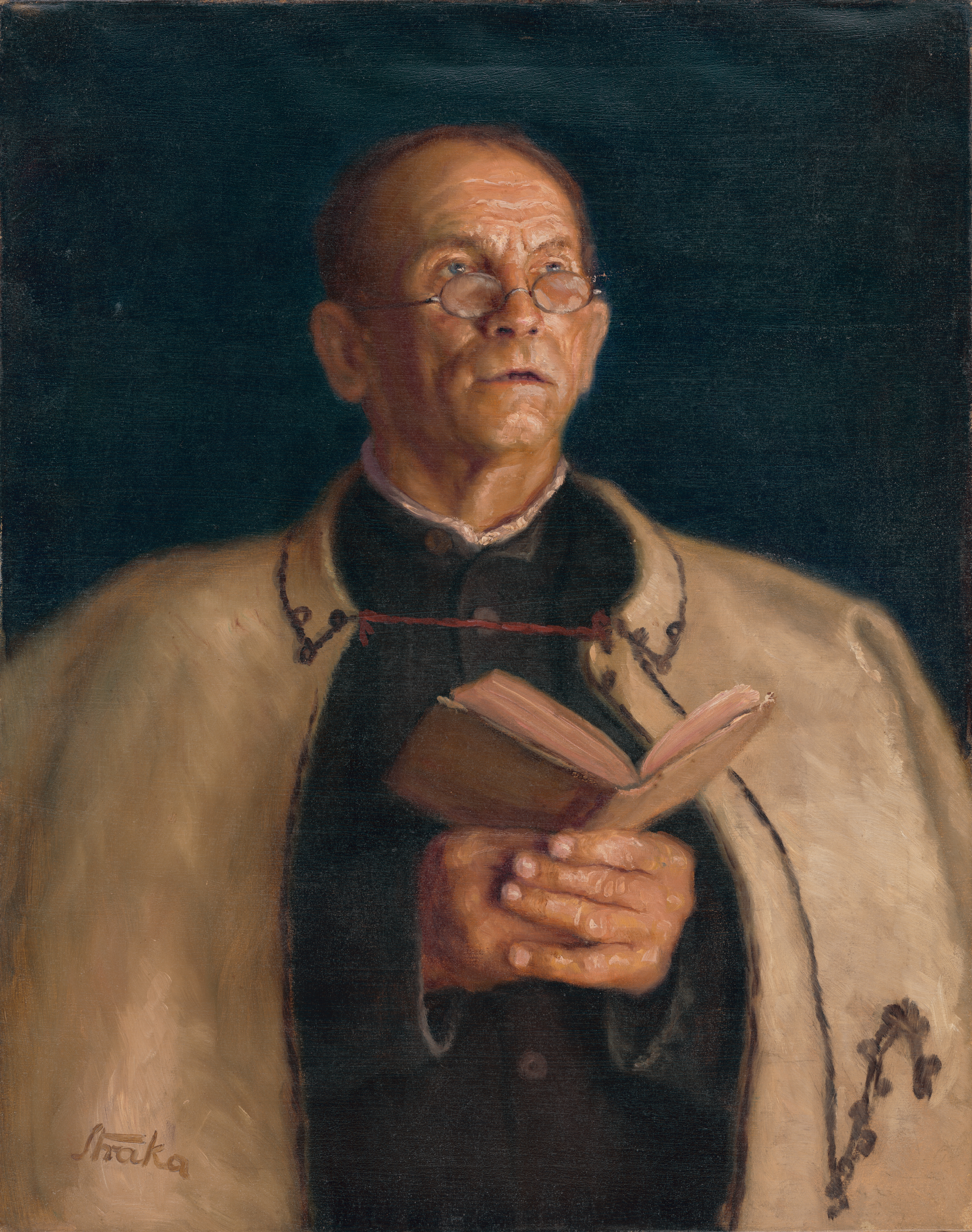
Precentor, painting by Štefan Straka, 1927

In Christianity, the cantor, female chantress, sometimes called the precentor or the protopsaltes (Greek: πρωτοψάλτης, lit. 'first singer'; from Greek: ψάλτης, romanized: psaltes, lit. 'singer'), is the chief singer, and usually instructor, employed at a church, with responsibilities for the choir and the preparation of the Mass or worship service. The term is also used for a similar task in Reform Judaism and in Ancient Egypt.

Generally, a cantor must be competent to choose and conduct the vocals for the choir, to start any chant on demand, and to be able to identify and correct the missteps of singers placed under them. A cantor may be responsible for the immediate rendering of the music, showing the course of the melody by movements of the hand(s) (cheironomia), similar to a conductor.

== Western Christianity ==
=== Roman Catholicism ===
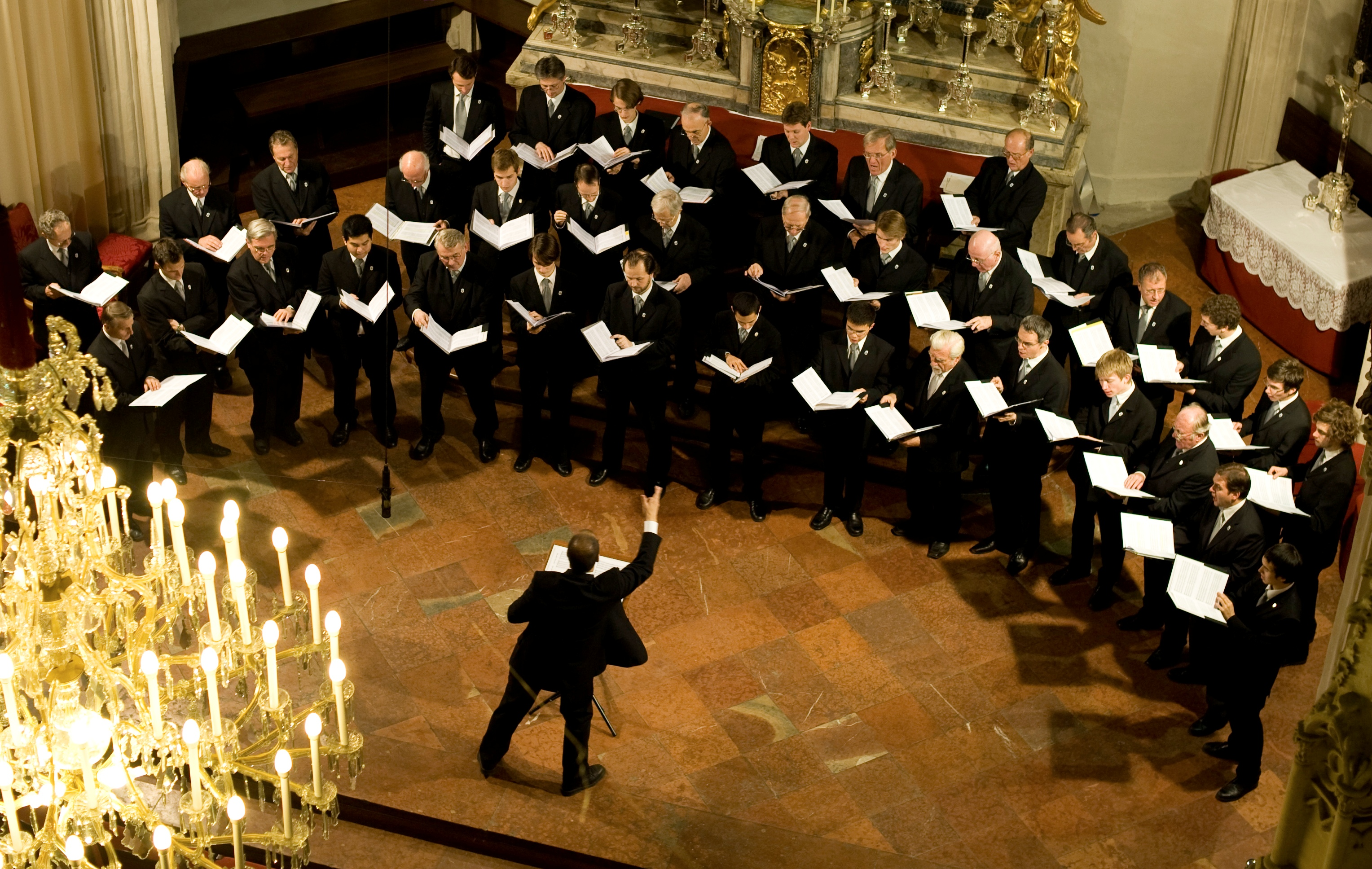
Chorus Viennensis for the Christmas concert in the Hofburg Chapel, Vienna

A cantor in the Roman Catholic Church is the leading singer of the choir, a bona fide clerical role.

The medieval cantor of the papal Schola Cantorum was called Prior scholae or Primicerius. In medieval cathedrals, the cantor or precentor directed the music and chant, and was also one of the ranking dignitaries of the chapter. During the 14th century in many churches, the cantor began to delegate his instruction of the singers to a master of music. After the introduction of harmonized music, some duties naturally fell to the conductor or choirmaster. Today, the cantor is a role that can be performed by a lay person. In parishes without a choir, the cantor serves to lead the responsorial singing with the congregation.

The cantor's locality in the church is most generally to the right of the choir, and directly to his left is his assistant, formerly called the succentor. A common custom for cantors was the bearing of the staff, which was the mark of his dignity and a visual representative of his sacred role inside the church. This custom still survives in some places.

=== Protestantism ===
In Protestant churches, the role of the cantor can be lay or pastoral. In Northern European cities, especially in Germany, the title of Cantor or Kantor survived the Reformation, and referred to a musician who supervised the music in several principal churches, taught in the boys' secondary school, and provided music for civic functions. Johann Sebastian Bach (Thomaskantor in Leipzig) and Georg Philipp Telemann (Hamburg) were among the famous musicians employed under this system.

In cathedral churches in the Anglican Communion, the precentor or head cantor is a member of the governing chapter, second in rank to the dean. His stall is opposite the dean's and the two sides of the divided choir are accordingly known as "decani" (dean's) and "cantoris" (precentor's).

=== Evangelical churches ===
In some Evangelical churches, the ministry of the worship leader or worship pastor is to direct the worship during worship service. They also direct rehearsals with the worship team. Training in worship is offered in some Bible colleges.

== Eastern Christianity ==
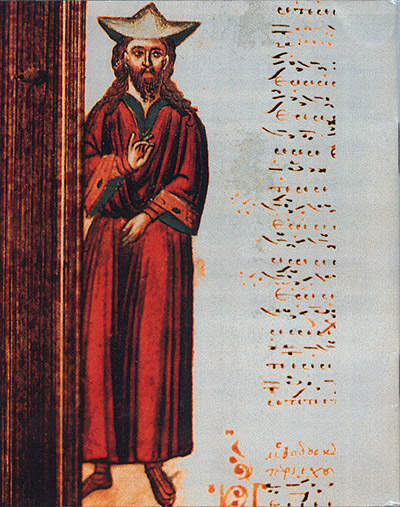
John Koukouzeles, saint and one of the most famous maistores of Psaltic Art at Constantinople, leading a choir by the cheironomic gesture of Ison (picture of a 15th-century chant manuscript at the Great Lavra Monastery, Mount Athos)

In the Eastern Orthodox, Oriental Orthodox, and Eastern Catholic Churches, a cantor, also called a chanter (Greek: ψάλτης, romanized: psaltes, lit. 'singer'; Church Slavonic: пѣвецъ, romanized: pievets), is a monk or a lay person in minor orders who chants responses and hymns in the services of the church. There are several titles for the psaltes, which depend on the recognition of his capabilities as a chanter, sometimes connected with an employment, by the local or Ecumenical Patriarchate. In some smaller communities it is also possible, that the community sings within an oral tradition and without any instruction by a protopsaltes, in other Orthodox Rites, there are various hierarchical offices, which can be passed during a long career, connected with a lifelong process of learning.

=== Byzantine tradition ===
Particularly in the Byzantine tradition, the cantor in charge of doing the music for a service is referred to as the protopsaltes (Gr. Πρωτοψάλτης), a term which may also refer to an office within a diocese or whole jurisdiction (see Domestikos), but this title was not used before the 12th century. The cantor or chanters sing the many hymns called for during the Divine Services and the Divine Liturgy. A chanter must be knowledgeable about the ecclesiastical modes as well as the complex structure of the services. At Constantinople the charge of a protopsaltes was prestigious and connected with Byzantine offices. In the tradition of the cathedral rite at Hagia Sophia, there was a distinction between the leader of the right choir (Domestikos) and the leader of the left choir (Lampadarios). Still during the last centuries, the usual career was to start (after serving as Protopsaltes of other cathedrals) as the "Second Domestikos of the Great Church" who assisted the first, then to proceed in the office of the teacher, and later even to the Lampadarios, who often replaced the left choir as a soloist called "monophonares" (see Kontakarion), and finally this career was sometimes continued by the promotion to the "Protopsaltes or Archon Psaltes (ἄρχοντες ψάλται) of the Great Church" of the Ecumenical Patriarchate.

=== Vestments in Orthodox rites ===
In the Greek tradition, a chanter will often wear the exorason, a black outer cassock with angel-wing sleeves. The Slavic tradition—which tends more commonly to use a choir rather than a cantor—assigns no specific vestment to the chanters, unless an individual has been ordained a Reader, in which case he would wear only the inner cassock (podryasnik) and put on the sticharion when he receives Holy Communion. In the Greek tradition, the chanters are stationed at a psalterion, a chanting podium positioned to the south and sometimes also to the north side of the sanctuary. In the Slavic tradition, the chanters are similarly positioned, and the area is referred to as the kliros.

== See also ==
- Anglican church music
- Contemporary Catholic liturgical music
- Gregorian chant
- Mass (music)
