= Lampadarius =

Type of slave in the Roman Empire

A lampadarius, plural Lampadarii, from the Latin lampada, from Ancient Greek "lampas" λαμπάς (candle), was a slave who carried torches before consuls, emperors and other officials of high dignity both during the later Roman Republic and under the Empire. Lampadarios in the post-Byzantine period designates the leader of the second (left) choir of singers in the Eastern Orthodox church practice.

== Lampadarius in Christianity ==
There seems no special reason to attribute to the lampadarii any ecclesiastical character, though their functions were imitated by the acolytes and other clerics who preceded the bishop or celebrant, carrying torches in their hands, in the solemn procession to the altar and in other processions.

In the Greek Orthodox Church, "Lampadarios" is a title (officium) of the Lower Clergy, given to the second in the rank Cantor, head of the left choir of Cantors. In the Ecumenical Patriarchate of Constantinople the Lampadarios is also responsible for teaching chanting to other clergy. The Lampadarios is usually candidate for promotion to First Cantor (Protopsaltes). He is also entitled to act as a witness at various important acts of the Church.
