= List of Byzantine composers =

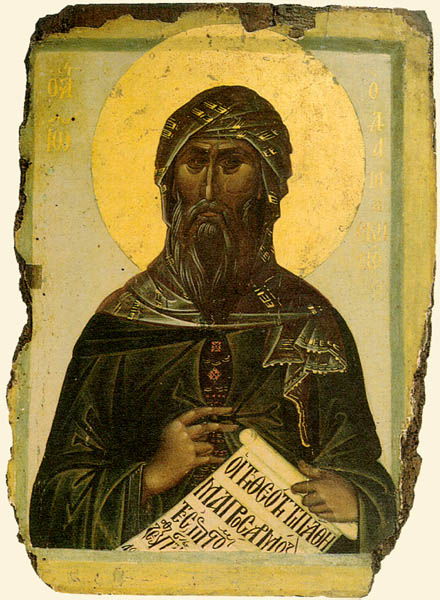
John of Damascus (c. 675 – c. 749), who was a major proponent of 8th century kanōns and the supposed creator of the octoechos

Musical traditions flourished throughout the Byzantine Empire (AD 330 to 1453) in both sacred and secular contexts. (Note: Even after the Fall of Constantinople in 1453 the Byzantine musical tradition continued in the Ecumenical Patriarchate of Constantinople through figures such as Panagiotes the New Chrysaphes, Petros Bereketis, Petros Peloponnesios, and Chrysanthos of Madytos, as well as Serbians such as Kir Stefan, Isaiah, Nikola and Kir Joakim.) Secular composers, subject to the criticism of Church Fathers and a dearth of extant sources, are unrecorded until the late 13th century during the Palaiologos period. Conversely, composers of religious music, known as hymnographers, are better known, and major figures are recorded throughout most of the empire's entire history. In both cases, like their medieval Western contemporaries, the biographical details of composers beyond their names and works are often scarce or nonexistent.

Before the reign of Justinian I (527–565), few specific personalities are recorded. The earliest, brothers Anthimos and Timokles, appear to have been important composers of troparia, but their work does not survive. The Byzantine tradition's first major form was the kontakion, of which Romanos the Melodist was the foremost composer. By the late 7th century the kanōn dominated in popularity; Andrew of Crete became its first significant composer, followed by John of Damascus and Cosmas of Maiuma, and later Theodore of Stoudios and Theophanes the Branded. The first secular composers are known only in the empire's final centuries, with Joannes Glykys, Joannes Koukouzeles, Xenos Korones emerging as leading figures. Partly due to the little information available, many modern studies of Byzantine music pay little attention to specific composers.

The recorded Byzantine composers were primarily men. The best known woman was Kassia, a prolific and important composer of sticheron hymns and the only woman whose works entered the Byzantine liturgy. A few other women are known to have been composers, Thekla, Theodosia, Martha and the daughter of John Kladas (her given name is unrecorded). Aside from Kassia, only the daughter of John Kladas has any surviving work, a single antiphon. Some Byzantine emperors are known to have been composers, such as Leo VI the Wise, Constantine VII and possibly John III Doukas Vatatzes.

== Byzantine composers ==
Byzantine composers
Name	Lifetime	Extant works	Remarks
Anthimos	fl. mid-5th century	Supposedly composed troparia; attributions unknown and none survive	Active during the reign of Leo I (457–474), the brothers Anthimos and Timokles are among the earliest known Byzantine composers by name. They are only recorded by Theodorus Lector (fl. 6th century) in an excerpt preserved by Nikephoros Kallistos, whose brief reference to them as composers of troparia may suggest the brothers were already well-known to his readers. (Note: Byzantinist Gregory Tucker remarks that "Theodore's rudimentary notice must have made sense in context, otherwise it would have been necessary to supply further details; we can therefore be confident not only that troparia were being composed in Constantinople at this time but also that some troparia were associated with the immediately recognisable names of their composers".) Apparently Anthimos was a monophysite who supported the Council of Chalcedon, while the Orthodox Timokles did not.
Timokles	fl. mid-5th century	Supposedly composed troparia; attributions unknown and none survive	Active during the reign of Leo I (457–474), the brothers Anthimos and Timokles are among the earliest known Byzantine composers by name. They are only recorded by Theodorus Lector (fl. 6th century) in an excerpt preserved by Nikephoros Kallistos, whose brief reference to them as composers of troparia may suggest the brothers were already well-known to his readers. Apparently Anthimos was a monophysite who supported the Council of Chalcedon, while the Orthodox Timokles did not.
Auxentios	fl. 5th century	The text to a single troparion survives (attribution uncertain); said to have composed others	A biography on Auxentios attributes the composition of a troparion to him
Anatolius of Constantinople	Died 458	A few hymns	–
Severus of Antioch	465–538	Many hymns	
John bar Aphtonia	c. 480 – c. 537	A few hymns	His hymns bare similarities to those of Severus of Antioch, whom he wrote a biography on
Romanos the Melodist	late 5th century – after 550	About 60 of the 85 kontakion attributed to him are considered authentic	The preeminent kontakion composer of his time
Kyriakos	fl. 6th century	No works survive	Contemporary of Romanos
Anastasius	fl. 6th century	No works survive	A composer recorded as "Anastasius" is thought to be a 6th century Byzantine emperor, either Anastasius I Dicorus (c. 431 – 9 July 518) or Anastasios II (Died 719). Contemporary of Romanos
Germanus I	c. 634 – c. 733	Various kanōns are attributed to him	If authentic, his kanōns would be earlier than those of Andrew of Crete and thus confirm Andrew is not the genre's originator
Andrew of Crete	c. 660 – c. 740	Hymns, primarily kanōns	Best known for his Great Kanōn, a 250 stanza hymn. Traditionally credited with inventing the kanōn, though modern scholars doubt this
John of Damascus (John Damascene)	c. 675 – c. 749	Many kanōns and troparia. Traditionally credited with inventing the octoechos, though modern scholars doubt this	A close colleague of Cosmas of Maiuma
Cosmas of Maiuma (Kosmas of Jerusalem)	fl. early 8th century	Various kanōns, sticheron, idiomelas and triōdias	A close colleague of John of Damascus
Stephen the Sabaite	Died 807	Idiomelas in the Triodion, Kanōns	
Theodore the Studite	759 – 826	Various kanōns	Kept a letter correspondence with Kassia; brother of Joseph the Confessor
Joseph the Confessor	fl. 9th century	Troparia, sticheron and kanōns	Brother of Theodore the Studite
Theophanes the Branded	775 – 845	Kanōns for saints and his brother, Theodorus.	Contributed to the Parakletike
Kassia	805/810 – 865/867	More than 50 liturgical works, primarily stichera. 26 have disputed authenticity	The only woman Byzantine composer whose work is included in the Byzantine liturgy. The most important and renowned woman in Byzantine music. She had a letter correspondence with Theodore the Studite
Joseph the Hymnographer	c. 816 – 886	Various kanōns, of which 525 survive.	Contributed to the Parakletike
Thekla	fl. 9th century	No works survive	Known to have written now lost kanōns
Theodosia	fl. 9th century	No works survive	Known to have written now lost kanōns. She was an abbess who lived near Constantinople
Leo VI the Wise	866 – 912	Hymns for the Great Feast of the Exaltation of the Cross	Was Byzantine emperor from 886 to 912
Martha	fl. End of the 9th century	No works survive	Abbess and mother of Simeon Stylites
Constantine VII	905 – 959	11 exaposteilaria anastasima and 3 sticheron	Was Byzantine emperor from 908 until 959 (co-emperor until 945)
Joannes Glykys	fl. Late 13th century	Chant and psalms	Purportedly the teacher of Korones and Koukouzeles
Nikephoros Ethikos	fl. c. 1300	Liturgical chants; 40 survive	His works are far more stylistically conservative than those of his contemporaries
Gregorios Glykys	fl. c. 1300	Liturgical chants; only a few survive, including a sticheron	Had the post of domestikos (in a musical context meaning "first singer of the left choir")
John Koukouzeles	fl. 1300–50	Many chants	One of the most illustrious musicians of his time; known as the "second source of Greek music" (John of Damascus being the first)
Xenos Korones	fl. 1325–50	Chants	
John Kladas	fl. 1400	Virtually every sacred genre of his time	He was particularly prolific and his daughter seems to have been a composer as well
Daughter of John Kladas	fl. 1400	A single antiphon is attributed to her	Her given name is unknown; recorded only as the daughter of John Kladas
John Laskaris	fl. first half of 15th century	Not particularly prolific;	Also a music theorist
Manuel Chrysaphes	fl. 1440–1463	A large amount of hymns, chants, kratēmata, mathēmata and anagrammatismoi among others	An extremely prolific composer; John VIII Palaiologos and Constantine XI Palaiologos were patrons of his music. (Note: He was also a noted music theorist, writing the treatise Peri tōn entheōroumenōn tē psaltikē technē kai hōn phronousi kakōs tines peri autōn which contains extensive and otherwise unknown information on contemporary Byzantine music, practice and theory.)
John Vatatzes	fl. mid 15th century		Long assumed to be the emperor John III Doukas Vatatzes, though this is no firm evidence for this
Janus Plousiadenos	c. 1429–1500		
