= John Laskaris =

John Laskaris or Lascaris may refer to:

- John IV Laskaris (1250–c.1305), emperor of Nicaea
- John Laskaris Kalopheros (1325/30–1392), Byzantine aristocrat
- John Laskaris (composer) (fl. early 15th century), Greek composer in Venetian Crete
- Janus Lascaris (c.1445–1535), Greek scholar
- Giovanni Paolo Lascaris (1560–1657), Grand Master of the Knights of Malta
