= John Koukouzeles =

14th-century Byzantine composer

Saint John Koukouzeles
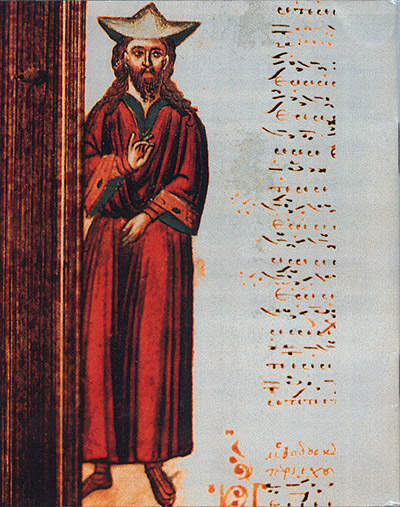
- St. John Koukouzeles depicted on a 15th-century musical codex at the Great Lavra monastery, Mount Athos, Greece
- Born: Dyrrhachium or Anatolia
- Venerated in: Eastern Orthodox Church
- Feast: 1 October

John Koukouzeles Papadopoulos (Greek: Ιωάννης Κουκουζέλης Παπαδόπουλος, romanized: Ioannis Koukouzeles Papadopoulos) was a Byzantine composer, singer and reformer of Byzantine chant. He was recognized as a saint by the Eastern Orthodox Church after his death. Among the most illustrious musicians of the Palaiologos dynasty, his music remains held in high esteem by Albanians, Bulgarians, Greeks, Macedonians, Romanians and Serbs.

== Name and etymology ==
The name "Koukouzeles" was not the composer's surname. His real surname was Papadopoulos. "Koukouzeles" is allegedly derived from the Greek word for broad beans (κουκιά, koukia) and a Slavic/Bulgarian word for cabbage (зеле, zele). Allegedly, the name appeared when Koukouzeles was asked in school about the food he was eating and he replied koukia kai zelie (Greek: κουκιά και ζελίε). This, however, is regarded as a folk etymology. The name is most likely derived from the Greek word koukoutzi (Greek: κουκούτζι, lit. 'seed') along with the common Greek suffix -elis (Greek: -έλης). A relation with the word koukoutseli (Greek: κουκουτσέλι, lit. 'little chicken (?)'), a Greek word which was used to refer to some kind of bird, has also been proposed.

== Life and career ==
Information about Koukouzeles' life and career is unclear and subject to controversy. Even the era in which he lived is disputed. It is conjectured that he lived between the 12th and 15th centuries. According to musicologist Gregorios Stathis, it is unlikely that Koukouzeles lived in the 12th or early 13th centuries, or after the late 14th century, proposing instead that he lived during the late 13th (c. 1270) and early 14th centuries (before 1341).

Information about his life is derived mainly from two sources. First, the large body of his musical manuscripts containing his works and secondly from copies of a late, anonymous and problematic work of dubious authority called Life. From the former, we learn that his last name was Papadopoulos; he studied with Xenos Koronis under a cantor named John Glykes (likely a reference to John XIII of Constantinople) and changed his name to Ioannikios when he became a monk.

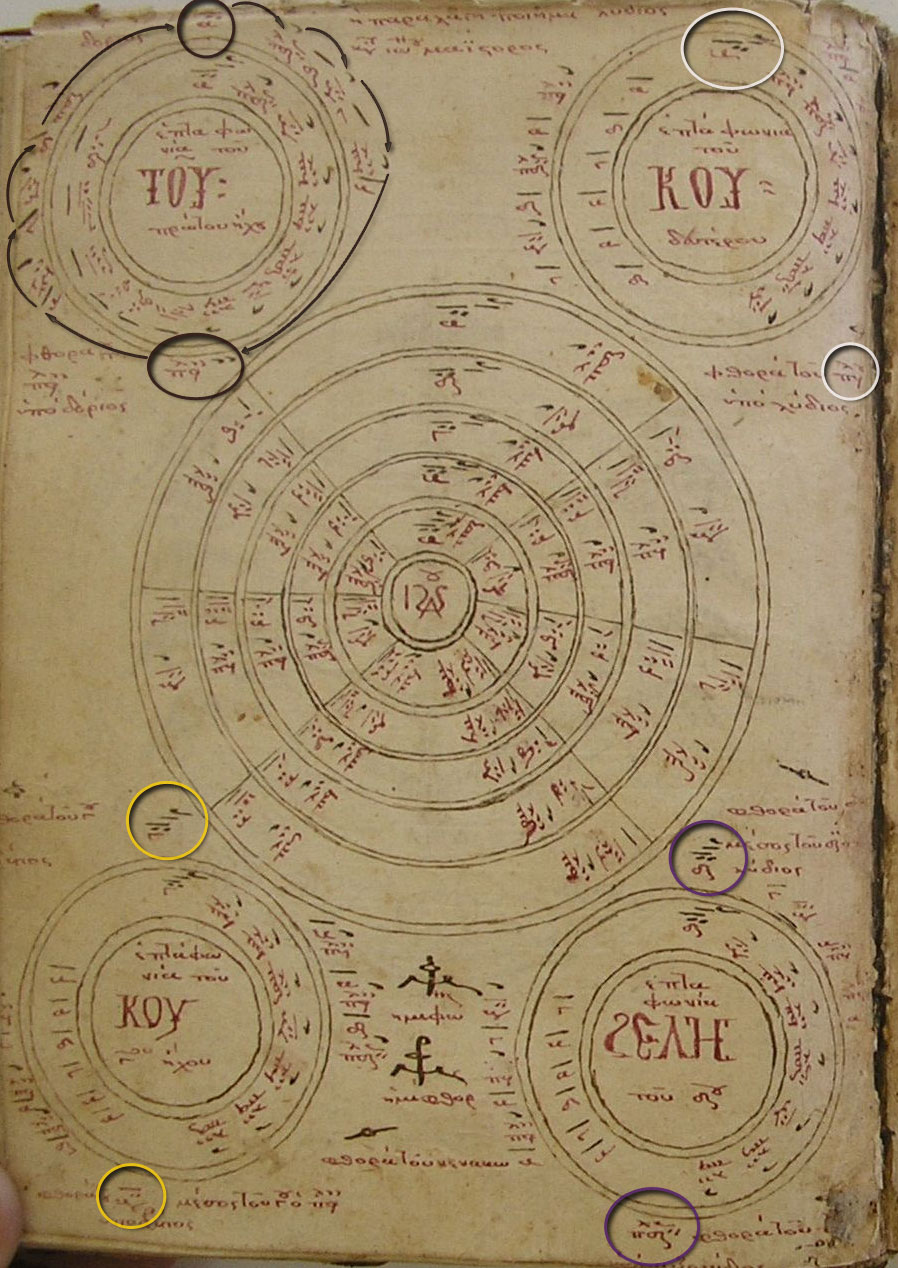
The wheel (trochos) known as "the solfège of Master John Koukouzeles" (ἡ παραλλαγὴ ποίημα κυρίου Ἰωάννου μαΐστορος τοῦ Κουκουζέλη)

According to the latter, the anonymous biography Life "of dubious authority", Koukouzeles was born in Dyrrhachium (modern-day Durrës, Albania) in the late 13th century to a father of unknown origins, (probably Greek) and a Bulgarian mother. He was orphaned in childhood. Nevertheless, the accuracy of Life is disputed, since it was written many years after the death of Koukouzeles and also makes several fantastical claims. According to a modern German historian, he was instead born in Anatolia under the Empire of Nicaea; this opinion is based on the existence of chromatic intervals in Byzantine music. As evidenced by his real surname Papadopoulos, he was probably the son of a priest.

At a young age he was noted and accepted into the school at the imperial court at Constantinople, where he received his education and established himself as one of the leading authorities in his field during the time. A favourite of the Byzantine emperor and a principal choir chanter, he moved to Mount Athos and led a monastic way of life in the Great Lavra. Because of his singing abilities, he was called "Angel-voiced".

== Musical style and compositions ==
Koukouzeles established a new melodious ("kalophonic") style of singing out of the sticherarion. Some years after the fall of Constantinople Manuel Chrysaphes characterised the sticheron kalophonikon and the anagrammatismos as new genres of psaltic art which were once created by Koukouzeles.

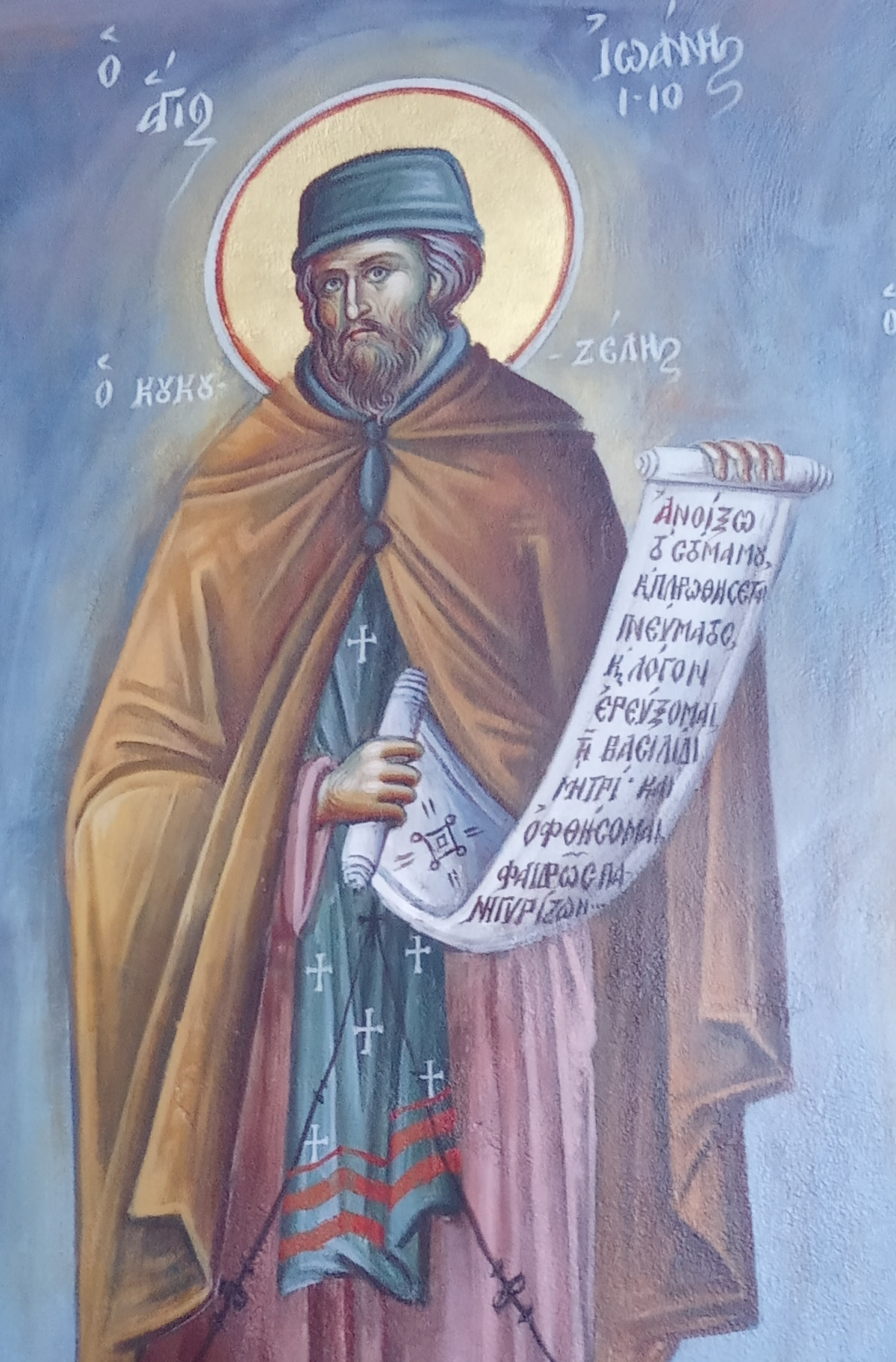
Mural of Saint John Koukouzeles inside an Orthodox church in Patras, Greece

== Reception ==
In general it is useful to make a distinction between compositions which can be verified as the compositions by Koukouzeles, and those which are simply based on the method which he taught (as a stylistic category based on the kalophonic melos as exemplified by Mega Ison). Even concerning famous compositions, their authorship is often a subject of scholarly debates whose concern is not always the talent of one individual composer – like the Polyeleoi of the Bulgarian allegedly dedicated to his mother that, according to some Bulgarian researchers, contains elements of traditional Bulgarian mourning songs. Greek editions of the same Polyeleos are different and especially the authorship of the Kratema used in the Bulgarian edition has been a controversial issue. Additionally, the word Voulgara might not refer to his alleged mother, but instead to the European bee-eater, a bird which was called by the same name. Concerning stichera kalophonika, there are numerous compositions made up in his name, but his authorship must be regarded as a certain school which had a lot of followers and imitators.

Modern print editions of chant books have only a very few compositions (different melismatic echos varys realisations of Ἄνωθεν οἱ προφήται, several Polyeleos compositions, the cherubikon palatinon, the Mega Ison, the Anoixantaria) which are almost never sung, except the short Sunday koinonikon, for the very practical reason that most of Koukouzeles' compositions, at least based on the exegetic transcriptions by Chourmouzios Chartophylakos, are simply too long.

== Sainthood and legacy ==
Koukouzeles is regarded as the most influential figure in the music of his period. He was later recognized as a saint by the Eastern Orthodox Church, his feast day being on 1 October.

A musical school in his native Durrës bears his name, Shkolla Jon Kukuzeli. Also, Kukuzel Cove in Livingston Island in the South Shetland Islands of Antarctica is named after Koukouzel, using the Bulgarian form of his name.

== Sources ==
- Alexandru, Maria (2011). "Byzantine Kalophonia, illustrated by St. John Koukouzeles' piece Φρούρηζον πανένδοξε in Honour of St. Demetrios from Thessaloniki. Issues of Notation and Analysis". Studii şi cercetări de istoria artei. Teatru, muzică, cinematografie. Serie novă. 49–50: 57–105.
- Audio on YouTube, John Koukouzelis: "Polielei na Bĕlgarkata in Glas 5" (extracts), Bulgarian Byzantine Choir, Dimitar Dimitrov Archived 2021-12-14 at Ghost Archive
- Conomos, Dimitri, ed. (1985), The Treatise of Manuel Chrysaphes, the Lampadarios: [Περὶ τῶν ἐνθεωρουμένων τῇ ψαλτικῇ τέχνῃ καὶ ὧν φρουνοῦσι κακῶς τινες περὶ αὐτῶν] On the Theory of the Art of Chanting and on Certain Erroneous Views that some hold about it (Mount Athos, Iviron Monastery MS 1120, July 1458), Monumenta Musicae Byzantinae – Corpus Scriptorum de Re Musica, vol. 2, Vienna: Verlag der Österreichischen Akademie der Wissenschaften, ISBN 978-3-7001-0732-3
- Koukouzeles, Ioannes (1819), Chourmouzios the Archivist (ed.), "Athens, National Library of Greece (EBE), Metochion of Panagios Taphos (ΜΠΤ) 703", Manuscript with Chourmouzios' transcriptions of 14th-century composers (Ioannes Glykys, Ioannes Koukouzeles, Xenos Korones, Ioannes Kladas etc.) according to the New Method, Istanbul
- Sarafov, Petĕr V., ed. (1912). "Biografiya na Sv. Ioan Kukuzel, Iz carigradskaya prĕvod (Aniksantari, Golĕmoto Iso, Poleyleyat na Bĕlgarkata, Heruvimska pĕsn, Pričastno, Svyše prorocy)". Rĕkovodstvo za praktičeskoto i teoretičesko izučvane na Vostočnata cĕrkovna muzika, Parachodni uroci, Voskresnik i Antologiya (Polielei, Božestvena služba ot Ioana Zlatoousta, Božestvena služba na Vasilij Velikij, Prazdnični pričastni za prĕz cĕlata godina, Sladkoglasni Irmosi). Sofia: Peter Gluškov. pp. 131–216.
- Williams, Edward V. (2001). "Koukouzeles [Papadopoulos], Joannes". Grove Music Online. Revised by Christian Troelsgård (8th ed.). Oxford University Press. doi:10.1093/gmo/9781561592630.article.15428. ISBN 978-1-56159-263-0. (subscription, Wikilibrary access, or UK public library membership required) (subscription required)
