= Papadic Octoechos =

Eight mode system used for religious chant compositions

Oktōēchos (here transcribed "Octoechos"; Greek: ὁ Ὀκτώηχος, pronounced in Constantinopolitan: Ancient Greek pronunciation: [oxˈtoixos]; from ὀκτώ "eight" and ἦχος "sound, mode" called echos; Slavonic: Осмогласие, Osmoglasie from о́смь "eight" and гласъ "voice, sound") is the name of the eight mode system used for the composition of religious chant in Byzantine, Syriac, Armenian, Georgian, Latin and Slavic churches since the Middle Ages. In a modified form the octoechos is still regarded as the foundation of the tradition of monodic Orthodox chant today.

Until 1204 neither the Hagia Sophia nor any other cathedral of the Byzantine Empire did abandon its habits, and the Hagiopolitan eight mode system came into use not earlier than in the mixed rite of Constantinople, after the patriarchate and the court had returned from their exile in Nikaia in 1261.

== Middle Byzantine Round notation ==
In the history of the Byzantine rite the Hagiopolitan reform was described as a synthesis of the cathedral rite and the monastic rite. Nevertheless, the Hagiopolitan octoechos did not come into use at the Hagia Sophia of Constantinople before the Papadic reform during the late 13th and the 14th century, after the patriarchate and the court had returned from exile in Nicaea. The reform of John Koukouzeles can be studied by a new type of treatise called "Papadike" (ἡ παπαδικὴ). It included a list of all neume signs which were taken from various chant books and their different notation systems. In the school of John Glykys this list had been organized as a didactic chant called Mega Ison which passed through all the eight echoi of the octoechos, while the singers memorize the signs and studied their effect in chant composition. This chant or exercise (μάθημα) had been invented by John Glykys, but most papadikai also add a second version in the redaction of John Koukouzeles who was probably his student. These lists prefer the use of Byzantine round notation, which had developed during the late 12th century from the late diastematic Coislin type. The modal signatures were referred to the Hagiopolitan octoechos. Because the repertoire of signs was expanded under the influence of John Glykys' school, there was a scholarly discussion to make a distinction between Middle and Late Byzantine notation. The discussion decided more or less against this distinction, because the Papadic school did not invent new neume signs, it rather integrated signs known from other chant books and their local traditions, including the books of the Constantinopolitan cathedral rite as they had been used until the Western conquest of Constantinople.

== The mixed rite of Constantinople ==
The so-called mixed rite which replaced the former tradition of the cathedral rite, resembled in large parts the Divine Liturgy of John Chrysostom, of Basil of Caesarea, and of the Presanctified Gifts, as they are in use until today. But many places of the Byzantine Empire did never accept the reform of the Palaiologan Constantinople.

These local differences explain, why the erotapokriseis treatises already followed the Studite reform and represent somehow an early form of papadike, so parts of it can later be found in the classical papadike manuscripts. The papadike itself had much in common with Latin tonaries. Intonation formulas and psalmody for the eight modes of the octoechos system can both be found in the book "akolouthiai" and some sticheraria, and these late manuscripts are the only sources of Byzantine simple psalmody today. The new book akolouthiai replaced several books, the psaltikon, the asmatikon, the kontakarion, and the typikon, it puzzled the soloist's, the domestikos', and the choir's part, and the rubrics of the typikon together. It contained several little books as kratemataria (a collection of additional sections composed over abstract syllables), heirmologia, and embellished compositions of the polyeleos psalms.

But in this combination the papadike appears from the 14th century, while the earliest version introduced a sticherarion written in 1289. This proves again the integrating role of the Middle Byzantine Round notation, which had developed as the notation of the book sticherarion since the 13th century.

== Papadike ==
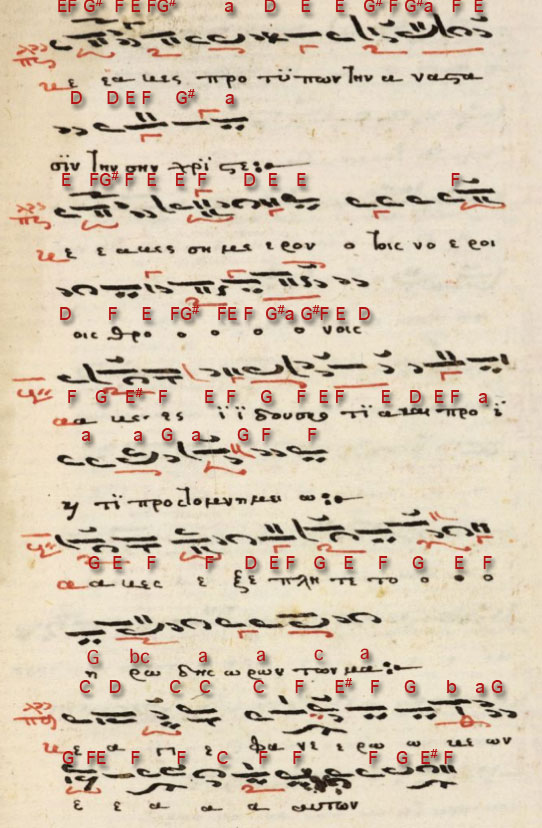
Intonations (ἐνηχήματα) for the echoi plagios devteros, varys, and plagios tetartos listed in a 17th-century Papadike treatise—the intonations are followed by chant incipits (GB-Lbl Ms. Harley 5544, fol. 8r)

Despite longer theoretical explanations by authors like Gabriel Hieromonachos (Hannick & Wolfram 1985), Manuel Chrysaphes (Conomos 1985), Ioannis Plousiadinos which were usually attached to it, the Papadike itself was rather based on lists and exercises with short verbal explanations. The composition of the Papadike can be illustrated by the Italian manuscript of Messina (Messina, Biblioteca Regionale Universitaria, Fondo SS. Salvatore, Messan. gr. 154), which was edited and referred by Oskar Fleischer who dated it back to the 15th century. Because the Papadike as introduction of the new book akolouthiai was regarded as very representative, this manuscript with its focus on John Glykys' method seems to be a copy of an earlier version. The manuscript which Fleischer had published from the reliefs of Friedrich Chrysander, is in fact a late copy of the 17th century which introduced the Anastasimatarion of Chrysaphes the New.

The following schedule describes the content of the Papadike of the Codex Chrysander and explains the difference to earlier Papadikai:

- Protheoria beginning with Ἀρχὴ σὺν Θεῷ ἁγίῳ τῶν σημαδίων τῆς ψαλτικῆς τέχνης ("The beginning with the Holy God of the signs used in the psaltic art..."). The signs are described and listed starting with ἴσον and the other signs which sound, including tempo signs.
- A list of the aphonic or "great signs" (Τὰ δὲ μεγάλα σημάδια).
- A list between seven and nine phthorai (πρῶτος, δεύτερος, τρίτος, τέταρτος, πλάγιος πρώτου, νενανῶ, βαρέως ἤχου) and two signs for a change of the tone system (μεταβολή κατὰ σύστημα)—ἡμίφωνον and εἰμίφθορον (obviously needed for a change into the triphonic system of phthora nana). The system of diatonic phthorai developed during the 14th century and was described by Manuel Chrysaphes in 1458 (Conomos 1985, pp. 55-65). It allowed notators to find each echos on every note just by changing its pitch class, so the diatonic phthorai had been used to indicate the exact place, where a transposition (μεταβολή κατὰ τόνον) would take place.
- The octoechos, the modal signatures (marytyriai) of the different echoi, their octave species, and their name sung with the enechema.
- A systematic list of all ascending and descending combinations used as phonic signs (σώματα and πνεύματα).
- The following section is dedicated to the practice of parallage—a kind of solfeggio in which each phthongos ("pitch class") is recognized by an echos and its intonation (enechema). The "methodos" is based on four columns which are also often organized in a circle. In this Papadike the circle form and the columns are illustrated by a parallage whose lines are shaped like a tree. Parallage is not the solfeggio as memorization of an existing melody (the latter called metrophonia is illustrated on page 16: ἡ κυρία μετροφωνία while the exercise has its own text, each step of the neumes is explained by the modal signature of its phthongos), but the exploration of the tone system by the use of the columns, circles, or its elaborated form as a tree.
- The seventh section is a collection of enechemata, which is very reduced in the 17th century redaction in comparison to earlier Papadikai—a troparion ἀνεβάς νεβὰν which memorizes always another echos with each verse, concludes the section. It does not only document the simple forms as used in parallage, but also mesos intonations which were obviously needed to transcribe the whole repertoire including the cathedral rite into Byzantine round notation and its medial signatures which all refer to the Hagiopolitan octoechos. This section proves the integrative use of this notation, its signatures and its phthorai, which made up the "Holy God of signs" and allowed him to recreate the different traditions of Eastern chant within the psaltic art and its notation.
- The eighth section adds some didactic chants, among them the Mega Ison—a sung list of all the signs which was used to exercise the method of embellished (kalophonic) melos passing through all the eight modes of Octoechos (πρῶτος, δεύτερος, τρίτος, τέταρτος, πλάγιος τοῦ πρώτου, πλάγιος τοῦ δευτέρου, βαρύς, πλάγιος τοῦ τετάρτου, πρῶτος), sung by a soloist skilled in the psaltic art. Other didactic chants like the Nouthesia pros mathitas by Chrysaphes the New made evident that this manuscript was written by the end of the 17th century.

The possibility of translating every style into an artistic experiment of psaltic art was based on the concept, that every step recognized by metrophonia was regarded as a degree of the mode as well as a mode (an echos) itself. The kalophonic method established a second method beside the traditional one and it created new books like the sticherarion kalophonikon, the heirmologion kalophonikon, etc.

=== Simple psalmody ===
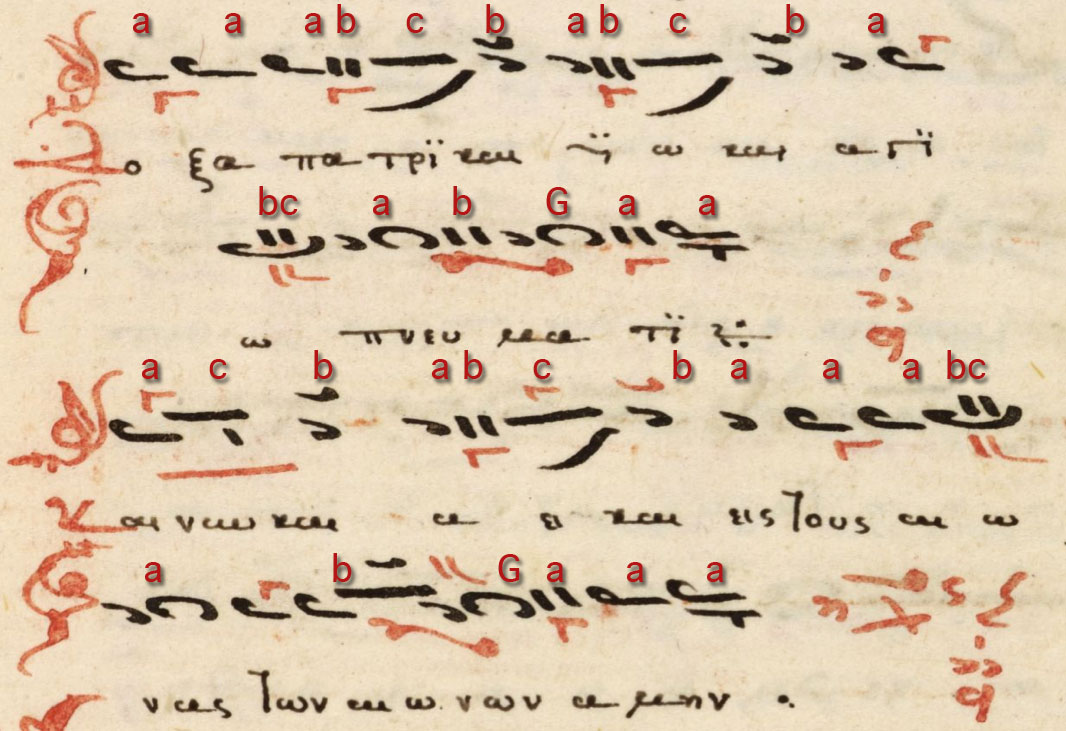
Simple Psalmody according to the first section of the Anastasimatarion of Chrysaphes the New dedicated to the echos protos—a 17th-century redaction between Papadic and modern use (GB-Lbl Ms. Harley 5544, fol. 13r)

The new book akolouthiai quoted simple psalmody usually in connection with the gradual psalms (anabathmoi, Ps. 119–130) and the earliest examples can be found in manuscripts since the 14th century. The practice can be regarded as part of a synthesis between Hagiopolitan Octoechos and the Constantinopolitan cathedral rite which was another result of the Studite reform. These models followed the octoechos and showed close resemblance to the melismatic compositions of the cathedral rite, at least in the transmission of psaltikon in Middle Byzantine notation, from which the expression of psaltic art had been taken.

During the 13th and 14th century psalmody was used in rather elaborated form than in the simple one copied from sticheraria. Traditional (palaia) forms of elaboration were often named after their local secular tradition as Constantinopolitan (agiosophitikon, politikon), Thessalonican (thessalonikaion), or a monastic one like those from Athos (hagioreitikon), the more elaborated, kalophonic compositions were collected in separate parts of the akolouthiai, especially the poetic and musical compositions over the Polyeleos-Psalm developed as a new genre of psaltic art and the names of the protopsaltes or maistoroi were mentioned in these collections.

=== Octoechos as a wheel ===
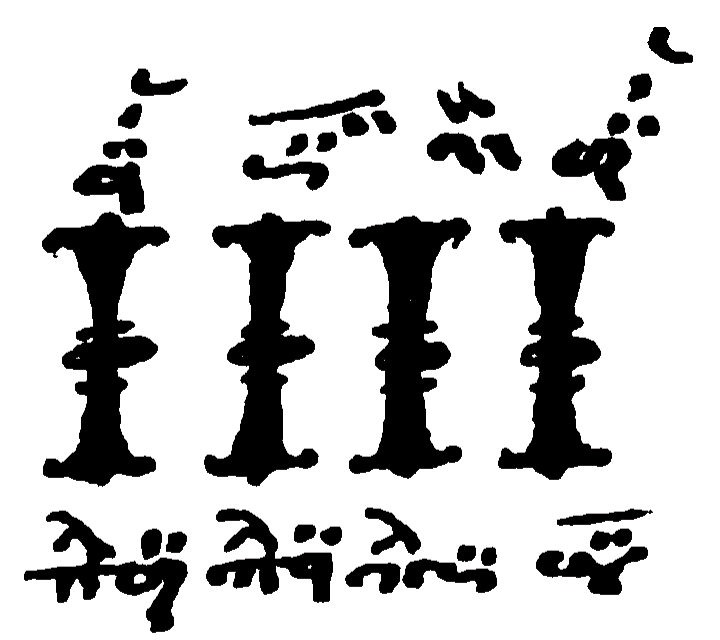
Papadike of the Anastasimatarion of Chrysaphes the New—4 columns which illustrate the Papadic "method of parallage" (D-Tu Codex Chrysander, p. 14)

The representation of the Hagiopolitan Octoechos by a wheel with four spokes or by four columns are based on the four elements of tetraphônia (τετραφωνία). These four elements were represented by the numerals πρῶτος, δεύτερος, τρίτος, and τέταρτος. According to the practice of parallage (παραλλαγή), the distinction between the authentic echoi, called "kyrioi", and the plagal echoi, called "plagioi", was simply defined as a direction. The intonation formulas (enechemata) of the plagioi were always used to move down, those of the kyrioi to move up. Wherever these four elements were repeated, they always generated a pure fifth for the pentachord between the pair of a kyrios at the top and a plagios at the bottom.

==== Simple parallage diagrams ====
According to the Papadic "method of parallage (solfeggio)", the logic of one column did not to represent the pentachord between kyrios and plagios of the same octave species, but the connection between a change of direction as α'↔πλδ', β'↔πλα', γ'↔πλβ', and δ'↔υαρ. The horizontal axis reads the top line from the left to the right for the ascending direction, while the bottom line has to be read from the right to the left for the descending direction. If these columns are organized in a circle like spokes of a wheel, the ascending direction becomes clockwise (blue arrows) and the descending counter clockwise (black arrows).

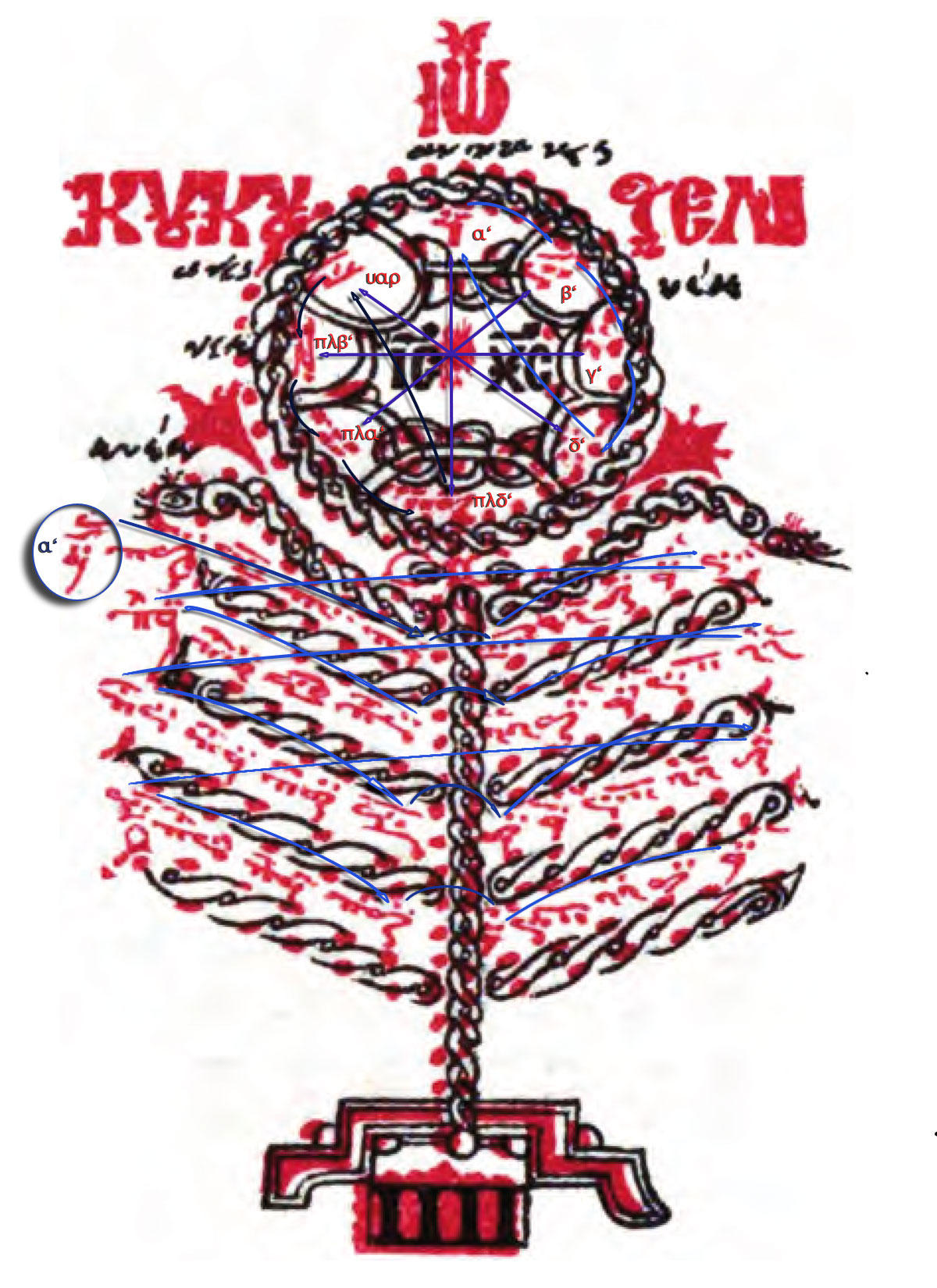
Papadike—Koukouzelian Tree and its Use for Parallage (D-Tu Codex Chrysander, p. 15)

In the Papadike of the Codex Chrysander this circle can be found as a "crown" on the top of the Koukouzelian tree, and the four columns of tetraphonia were probably represented at the foot of the tree. For an understanding of the phthongoi and the way of parallage between them it is necessary to discover an additional protos signature which is written left to the left upper branch of the tree: echos protos as starting and final pitch class (phthongos) of the ascending solfeggio (parallage) written in four rows shaped like a tree (its direction is indicated by blue arrows).

In the wheel on the top the descending and the ascending parallage has to move within a half circle described by the enechemata of the plagioi or the kyrioi echoi. If the clockwise ascending direction arrived at the intonation formula of echos tetartos (about 4 and a half), the way which continues to move up, jumps back to the position of 12 o'clock, where the signature of echos protos can be found. If the parallage changes the direction and descends from echos protos (ἦχος πρῶτος) to echos plagios tou tetartou (ἦχος πλάγιος τοῦ τετάρτου), the way of the parallage takes the spoke down from 12 to 6 o'clock. From here (echos plagios tetartos) the way following the descending direction jumps again to the position of half past 10 o'clock, the place (phthongos) of the grave mode or echos varys (ἦχος βαρύς), and continues in counter clockwise direction to the phthongoi of plagios devteros (ἦχος πλάγιος τοῦ δευτέρου), plagios protos (ἦχος πλάγιος τοῦ πρώτου), and plagios tetartos (ἦχος πλάγιος τοῦ τετάρτου).

Each direction within a half circle divides the wheel into an ascending (from twelve to half past four) and a descending hemisphere (from half past ten counter clockwise to six). While the ascending way of parallage is indicated by blue arrows and the descending one by black arrows, the spokes are marked by dark blue double arrows, because both directions, the ascending as well as the descending parallage, are possible.

The double meaning of each modal signature as a kind of pitch class (phthongos) and an own echos or mode makes it necessary to distinct two levels: melos, the melody itself, and metrophonia, the memorization of a pitch sequence notated in phonic neumes which is followed step by step by the intonation formula as a kind of pitch class (phthongos) by the intonation formula of a certain echos.

In the following four rows, shaped like branches of a tree, we find the ascending parallage moving through the pentachords between the finales of kyrios and plagios. Like the intonation formulas (enechemata) of the authentic modes (kyrioi echoi) the melos moves up to the finales of the kyrioi echoi. Because the solfeggio does not follow the basic structure of a notated chant, but just moves up the next pitch class, the solfeggio demonstrated here is not metrophonia, but an illustration of parallage. While this tree had been written on page 15 in red colour, there is another version of the ascending parallage on page 13, written in black ink.

The usual ascending way of parallage corresponds to a simple reading from the left to the right, line by line, down the tree. This "method of parallage" has been already explained on page 13 of Codex Chrysander. Here, the way of parallage is interrupted by enechemata which mark the stations by the standard intonation formulas and their neumes (here only represented by the modal signatures of the phthongoi):

α (D)—πλδ' (C)—υαρ (B flat)—πλβ' (A)—πλα' (Γ)—β' (A)—γ' (B flat)—δ' (C)—α' (D)—β' (E) (devteros intonation transcr. on E:) β' πλα' πλδ' α' β'

πλα' (D)—πλδ' (C)—υαρ (B flat)—πλβ' (A)—γ' (B flat)—δ' (C)—α' (D)—β' (E)—γ' (F)

πλβ' (E)—πλα' (D)—πλδ' (C)—υαρ (B flat)—δ' (C)—α' (D)—β' (E)—γ' (F)—δ' (G)

υαρ (F)—πλβ' (E)—πλα' (D)—πλδ' (C)—α' (D)—β' (E)—γ' (F)—δ' (G)—α' (a) (protos intonation transcr. on a:) α' πλδ' υαρ πλβ' πλα' β' γ' δ' α'

But there is no demonstration of the descending parallage, neither within the tree nor by any additional example. There is just the wheel on the top which suggests a chain of plagioi intonations following the wheel counterclockwise.

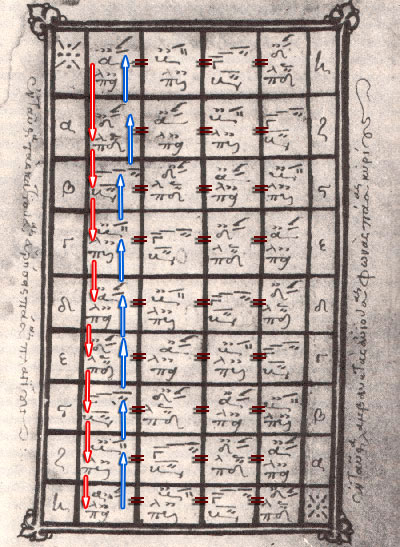
Papadike—κανώνιον καὶ ἡ παραλλαγή τοῦ Γαβρϊὴλ from the manuscript GR-AOh Ms. 53, fol. 3.

==== Diagrams for parallagai with transpositions ====
===== The kanonion =====
The simplest and presumably earliest form which is also the closest to Ancient Greek science treatises, is the representation of the different metabolai kata tonon (μεταβολαὶ κατὰ τόνον) by the kanōnion (also used in the translation by Boethius). This table is ascribed to Gabriel Hieromonachos and can be read in four directions.

The vertical directions are indicated by the first and last column. The first column shows the 8 steps (phônai) in descending direction using the enechemata of the plagioi which are written at the bottom of each cell (follow the red arrows), the last column shows the 8 steps (phônai) in ascending direction using the enechemata of the kyrioi which are written at the top of each cell (follow the blue arrows). This way each cell can be left in ascending or descending direction.

On the first sight it seems that the horizontal direction is ascending from left to the right and descending from the right to the left, but the intonations have to be sung on the same pitch during a horizontal transition, because in the contemporary notation practice diatonic phthorai indicate a change of the dynamis (the pitch class) whatever is the frequency of its pitch. As example the Doxastarion oktaechon Θεαρχίῳ νεύματι, one of the stichera which passes through all the echoi of the octoechos, in the short realization of Petros Peleponnesios finds the echos tritos "on the wrong pitch". On the phthongos which is expected as the pitch of the echos tetartos, the echos tritos is introduced by the enechema of phthora nana. This metabole kata tonon (μεταβολή κατὰ τόνον) can be localized in the kanonion as follows. If the untransposed column is the first with the parallage (here marked with arrows), the phthongos of protos or plagios protos is in the last line. The echos tetartos is expected three steps or phonai above, which is three lines higher, indicated by "Γ" (3) in the last column which counts the ascending steps. In the fourth column with modal signatures, the singer finds in the same line the transposition which turns the phthongos of echos tetartos into the echos tritos. As long as they have localized this transposition, singers will always find their way back to the untransposed column.

By this example the use of Gabriel's kanonion as illustration of the Byzantine tonal system, as it can be found in same Papadikai, becomes evident. A protopsaltes or maistoros who was well skilled in the psaltic art, could use these memorial landscapes in order to find their way through the labyrinth of tonal relation- and kinships. Even in improvised teretismata or nenanismata, inserted sections using abstract syllables, complex structures were possible, a soloist could pass through several transpositions and was still able to find their way out—which meant back to the transposition of the first column and the echos of the main signature.

===== The Koukouzelian wheel (τροχὸς) =====
Directly on the fundament of the kanonion and its passage through 8 steps through the tetraphonic system of parallage is constructed another form of the Koukouzelian wheel or trochos (τροχὸς), which has four simple wheels at the margin, and a big one with five rings in the center which puzzles the four simple ones together. In fact, all these wheels look at the whole tone system through a small window of just one pentachord.

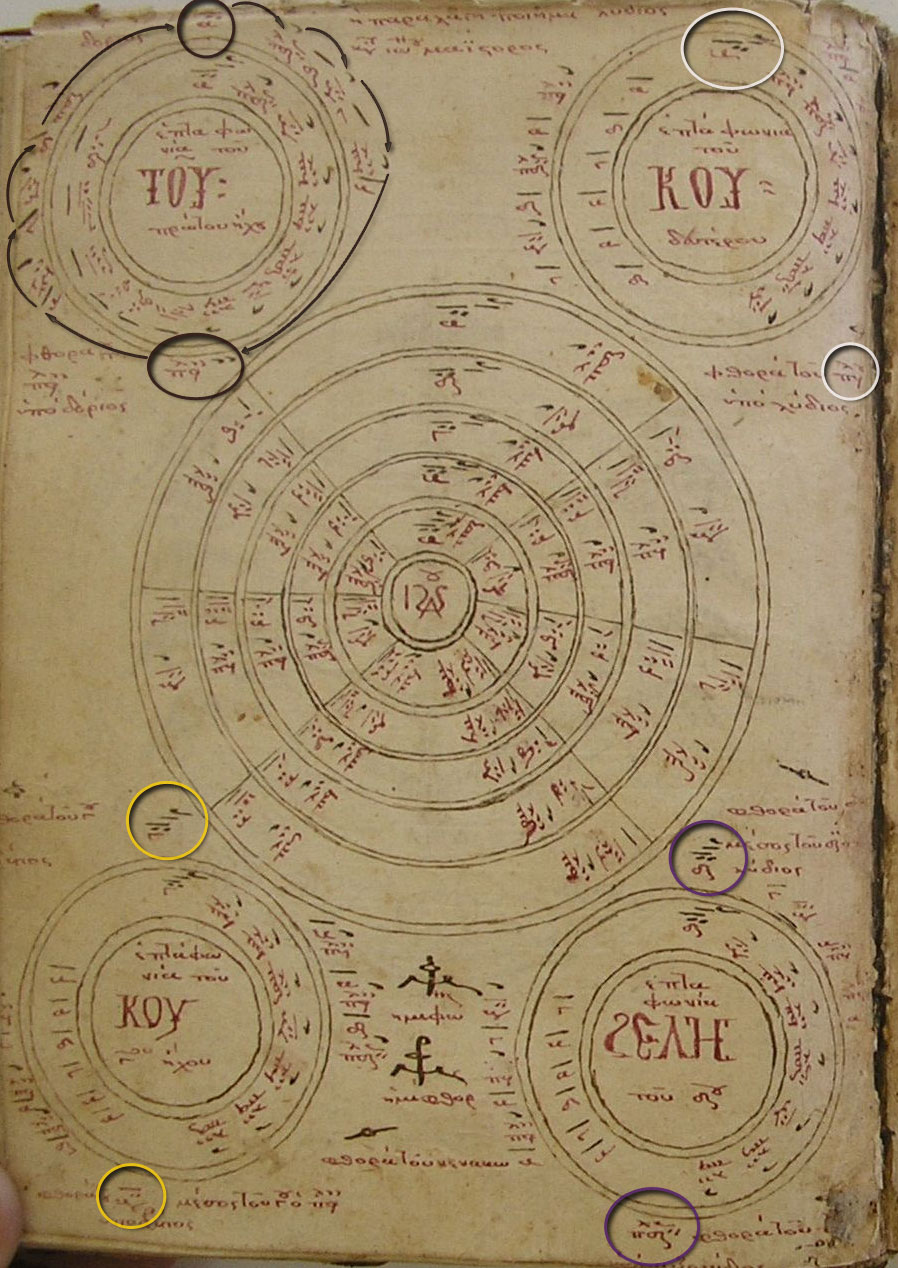
"Parallage of John Koukouzeles": The four peripheral wheels for the Octoechos (top left: protos echoi; top right: devteros echoi; bottom left: tritos echoi; bottom right: tetartos echoi) and the tetraphonic tone system and its transpositions in the center—Koukouzelian wheel in an 18th-century manuscript (manuscript of the private collection by Demetrios Kontogiorges)

Here, the four columns of Gabriel's kanonion had been completed by a fifth one whose symbols are identical with the first column. Now they are all shaped as five rings and in comparison with the kanonion the order of them had been inverted, so that the second ring turns the echos protos into the plagios tetartos (instead of into the devteros as in the second column of the kanonion), the third into the echos varys, the fourth into the plagios devteros, and the inner finally into the plagios protos.

The second coincidence with the kanonion is that each phthongos has a kyrios signature with the soma ("body") neume for one ascending step (ὀλίγον) and a plagios signature of the same echos with the soma ("spirit") neume for one descending step (ἀπόστροφος). This way the pentachord can be passed in ascending and descending direction clockwise as well as counterclockwise. From whatever phthongos, each place of the wheel can be left in ascending as well as in descending direction. The five rings are another important innovation in comparison with the other memorial landscapes, the substitution of the kyrios by the plagios (passing from the outer to the most inner ring) and vice versa was frequently used by composers for the effect of a register change into the lower or higher pentachord.

The four simplified circles at the margin have been derived from the transposition of the protos pentachord into the tetartos one (second ring), into the tritos pentachord (third ring), and into the devteros pentachord (fourth ring). While the rings of the big wheel in the centre are representing the tone system and all its possible transitions (including all the metabolai kata tonon), the four small outer rings represent the simple parallage within the melos of a certain echos and within pentachord which connects the kyrios with the plagios.

The τροχὸς in the version of a late 18th-century manuscript of Papadike adds the aspect of the heptaphonic tone system to the peripheral wheels, dedicated to the diatonic kyrios and plagios of the four octaves. In fact, this hybrid form corresponds to the oldest source of the Koukouzelian wheel. The tetraphonic parallage is written outside and just shows the pentachord of protos in the circle on the left top and here its parallage was only written in clockwise direction (see the way marked by the arrows). The psaltes start with the enechema of echos protos, which is descending and ascending stepwise the pentachord with its beginning and end on the kyrios finalis (the pentachord D—a for example).

ἀνανεανές (α')	→ νεαγίε (πλδ') → ἀανές (υαρ) → νεχεανές (πλβ') →	ἀνέανες (πλα')
ἀνανεανές (α')	← ἅγια (δ') ← ἀνεανές (γ') ← νεανές (β') ←	ἀνέανες (πλα')

Thus, it simply demonstrates the fifth equivalence of tetraphonia. A rather interesting experiment is the parallage down to the lower octave starting from the same phthongos of each kyrios echos in every peripheral circle. In the center of the Dorian circle (on the left top) is written "heptaphonia of the first echos" (ἐπταφωνία τοῦ πρώτου ἤχου), and starting from the kyrios protos the parallage descends to the lower octave (for example a—A—a) which is not heptaphonic at all, because the "octave" is now descending to the phthongos of plagios devteros according to the tetraphonia of parallage, not to the phthongos of plagios protos:

ἀνανεανές (α')	→ νεαγίε (πλδ') → ἀανές (υαρ) → νεχεανές (πλβ') → ἀνέανες (πλα') → νεαγίε (πλδ') → ἀανές (υαρ) →	νεχεανές (πλβ')
ἀνανεανές (α')	← ἅγια (δ') ← ἀνεανές (γ') ← νεανές (β') ← ἀνανεανές (α') ← ἅγια (δ') ← ἀνεανές (γ') ←	νεχεανές (πλβ')

For the devteros circle (on the right top) the tetraphonic parallage even creates the augmented octave between echos devteros (b natural) and echos varys (B flat) as "heptaphonia of the devteros echos" (ἐπταφωνία τοῦ δευτέρου).

The idea of parallage here is not to create the octave species of a certain echos, but to explore a relation to its next neighbour which is echos devteros in case of the protos parallage, or echos varys in case of the devteros parallage. It is evident that the latter seems to be a rather distant neighbourhood. Thus, the heptaphonia of each echos emphasizes the difference between heptaphonia and tetraphonia. Since parallage in itself always follows tetraphonia and obeys fifth equivalence, it is impossible to create octave equivalence.

The octave equivalence of heptaphonia within the melos of a certain echos can be rather explained by another use which might be called "the heptaphonia of the plagios echos". The chanter moves up and down passing the pentachord and the higher tetrachord of the octave. It is only possible to ascend two steps from the kyrios and then the octave has to be fulfilled by the octave of the plagios of each echos. This method follows exactly the Latin description of alia musica, whose author probably referred to the opinion of an experienced psaltes:

For the full octave another tone might be added, which is called ἐμμελῆς: "according to the melos".

"Another" could mean "outside of the tetraphonia (τετραφωνία)", the tone system which was so strongly identified with the Koukouzelian wheel and its parallage, that it was also called the "trochos system" (σύστημα τοῦ τροχοῦ, σύστημα κατὰ τετραφωνίαν). Nevertheless, according to tetraphonia the octave of plagios protos (e.g. D—d) does not go up to the phthongos of plagios protos, but to the phthongos of kyrios tetartos (the authentic fourth echos), the octave of plagios devteros (e.g. E—e) does go up to the phthongos of kyrios protos, etc.

==== Trochos system ====
The few words of the alia musica compilation contain a short explanation within octave equivalence which is usually not given by the authors of Papadikai. Instead the Papadike just contained systematic lists of signs and parallage diagrams, but it also offered useful exercises which aimed to teach different methods of how to create a melos during performance. Concerning the tetraphonic or "trochos system" every chanter had to deal with discrepancies which existed during parallage with regard to octave equivalence. Within the practice of psaltic art, it was nothing more than the experience of how to change from one to another echos. Roughly it can be said that tetraphonia was the level of composition and of memorizing a certain model of traditional chant, while heptaphonia was the conventional level of the exposition of a certain echos and its melos—a kind of model which belonged to a certain echos. Chanters trained in psaltic art were already familiar with them, after they had reached the very basic level.

===== History of its reception =====
Within the Latin treatises the practical use of tetraphonia was plausible to the author of Musica enchiriadis, even the practice of its transposition was reflected as "absonia" to a certain degree. By the 11th century the so-called "Dasia system" was refused by Guido of Arezzo and Hermann of Reichenau, despite its use within the practice of discant—for the very reason, that fifth equivalence excluded somehow octave equivalence. Nevertheless, it is remarkable that its practical use within the Greek octoechos was not only recognized, but also explained by the proper Greek terms.

In the later treatises about psaltic art (15th century), which offer further explanations to the Papadike like those by Gabriel Hieromonachos, Manuel Chrysaphes, and by Ioannis Plousiadinos, there was obviously only a problem of ignorance, but not the Western one that the tetraphonic system excluded the heptaphonic and vice versa. The simple solution of Manuel Chrysaphes was a formal distinction between the musical structure written in notation, its recapitulation by the solfeggio or the use of tetraphonic parallage (παραλλαγή) which is called metrophonia (μετροφωνία), and the establishment of the musical performance by the "thesis of the melos" (θέσις τοῦ μέλου) according to its traditional "method" (μέθοδος). According to him the seduction to confuse heptaphonia with tetraphonia only existed for those, who were so ignorant concerning psaltic art that they did not even understand the difference between parallage and melos.

τοίνυν ψαλτικὴ ἐπιστήμη οὐ συνίσταται μόνον ἀπὸ παραλλαγῶν, ὡς τῶν νῦν τινες οἴονται, ἀλλὰ καὶ δι’ ἄλλων πολλῶν πρότων, οὕς αὐτίκα λέξω διὰ βραχέων. τὸ γὰρ τῆς παραλλαγῆς χρῆμα κατὰ τὴν ψαλτικὴν τὸ εὐτελέστερόν τε τῶν ἐν αὐτῇ πάντων καὶ εὐκολώτατον· κἂν εἴποι τις ὡς μέλος ἐποίησα καὶ κατὰ τὰς φωνάς ἐστιν ἀνενδεές, οὐδὲ μιᾶς ἀπούσης ἥνπερ ἔδει παρεῖναι καὶ τὸ ὀρθὸν εἶναι καὶ ὑγιὲς ὄντως ἀπὸ παραλλαγῶν, ἔχει ὥστε μὴ χρείαν εἶναι μηδεμίαν ἄλλην ἐν αὐτῷ ζητεῖν τελεότητα, κακῶς φρονεῖν τε καὶ λέγειν ἡγητέον τὸν τοιοῦτον καὶ ἔξω τοῦ τῆς ἐπιστήμης ὀρθοῦ λόγου· […] ἐπεὶ εἰ ὅπερ ὁ τοιοῦτος ὑπ’ ἀμαθίας ἴσως ἐρεῖ τὸ ὀρθὸν εἶχε μεθ’ ἑαυτοῦ, οὐδεμία ἦν ἄν χρεία οὐδ’ ἀνάγκη τοῦ τὸν μὲν Γλυκὺν Ἰωάννην πεποιηκέναι τὰς μεθόδους τῶν κατὰ τὴν ψαλτικὴν θέσεων, τὸν δὲ μαΐστορα Ἰωάννην μετ’ αὐτον τὴν ἑτέραν μέθοδον καὶ τὰ σημάδια ψαλτά, εἶτα μετ’ αὐτὸν πάλιν τὸν κορώνην τὰς ἐτέρας δύο μεθόδους τῶν κρατημάτων καὶ τὴν ἑτέραν τῶν στιχηρῶν· ἔδει γὰρ καὶ τούτου λοιπὸν καὶ τοὺς ἄλλους ἅπαντας ἀρκεῖσθαι ταῖς παραλλαγαῖς μόναις καὶ μηδέν τι περαιτέρω πολυπραγμονεῖν, μηδὲ περιεργάζεσθαι μήτε περὶ θέσεων, μήθ’ ὁδοῦ, μήτ’ ἄλλης ἡστινοσοῦν ἰδέας τεχνικῆς.

Thus, the science of chanting does not consist only of parallage, as some of the present generation imagine, but includes other methods which I shall now mention briefly. The practice of parallage is the least significant of all techniques, and the easiest. If someone were to say, 'I have composed a melody which does not lack notes—not a single one is missing which ought to be there—and it is really correct and sound in its use of parallage so that nothing is absent nor any other element needed for perfection', we must consider that such a person thinks and speaks wrongly and has deviated from the correct principles of science […] For, if he were right, as in his ignorance he would probably claim to be, there would have been no need for Ioannes Glykys to have composed methods for the theseis in chanting and after him for the maïstor Ioannes to have composed another method and the chanted signs, and after him also for Korones to have composed the other two methods of the kratemata and the other for the stichera.

While "melos" was the very level of a certain echos, tetraphonia became rather an instrument of transition. There was either a closed form, made up by patterns and conventions of a certain melos defined by one echos and the octave over its basic degree, or the form was opened by tetraphonia and the possibility to change to another echos (μεταβολή κατὰ ἤχον).

The solution of Gabriel Hieromonachos was to establish a priority of the echos protos by the mese (a) by the middle chord of the oud and to ascend seven steps with the enechemata of kyrioi echoi and to descend seven steps by the enechemata of the plagioi echoi which was a common method since Al-Kindi who was probably referring to a practice of Greek musicians. If he had done so for the diatonic melos of the devteros, he would probably have started in the same way from the nete diezeugmenon (b) without descending an augmented octave, but down to the hypate hypaton (B natural). But the ancient systema teleion explained the octave species. Thus, being within the melos also different echoi and their ambitus had been separated, because an f or b flat as the octave of the tritos melos (B flat—b flat, F—f) had to become an f sharp or b natural within the octave of the diatonic tetartos melos (C—c, G—g). On the other hand, the trochos system allowed always a re-disposition and register change of the octoechos, so the conversion of a plagios into a kyrios (from the inner to the outer ring) and vice versa (from the outer to the inner ring) was the most common form of transposition (μεταβολή κατὰ τόνον) and it explains the fifth ring in the center of the composed Koukouzelian wheel.

The 19th-century reform according to the New Method of Chrysanthos of Madytos replaced the former solfeggio or metrophonia based on the tetraphonic use of the enechemata which referred to the eight modes of the Octoechos by an heptaphonic and monosyllabic solfeggio of just seven syllables ζω, νη, πα, βου, γα, δι, and κε—not unlike the Western solfeggio (Si, Do, Re, Mi, Fa, Sol, and La). But his concern was less the integration of the Western tone system which abandoned during the 11th century the tetraphonia in favour of the systema teleion than the integration of the Ottoman reception of the same system, which had become common to all musicians of the Empire, whether they were Sufis, Sephardic Hazzans, Armenian, Persian or Kurdish musicians.

The "Occidental school" as Maria Alexandru liked to call it, went into the footsteps of Chrysanthos with their assumption that the systema teleion or heptaphonia was the only explanation and was adapted according to the Western perception of the modes as octave species. According to Chrysanthos the tritone B—F had become the tritos pentachord, while Oliver Strunk defined G—g as the tetartos octave unlike Chrysanthos and the living tradition as the point of reference of the "Greek school" who all set the tetartos octave a fifth lower C—c, so that the seventh was big and not small. Both interpretations corrupted the tetraphonic or trochos system (σύστημα κατὰ τετραφωνίαν), but they were less an ignorant confusion between metrophonia and melos, as Manuel feared it, it was motivated by a certain universalism, which the Phanariotes claimed, when they used Chrysanthos' system to transcribe Western melodies and the makamlar as well.

===== Reconstruction of the Papadic Octoechos and its transition models =====
Manuel Chrysaphes separated the level of metrophonia by the formal function of a changing disposition, which allowed always to find a kyrios in the upper pentachord, if the phthongos was plagios, or a plagios in the lower pentachord, if the phthongos was kyrios. But plagios and kyrios on the level of metrophonia were only defined by the direction from which singers arrived at a certain phthongos. As a degree of a certain mode or echos like kyrios and plagios the psaltes left the level of parallage and metrophonia, and entered the level of a melos defined by one echos and one of the peripheral wheels, and on this level the tritos was always the octave on B flat or F, while the octave of B natural is always a devteros octave which can be reached by a transposition (μεταβολή κατὰ τόνον) which turns the protos on D into a tetartos and looks from there for its mesos on B natural. Such a transposition will cause a transition within the central wheel, which turns the phthongos of protos (α') on the top of the outer ring into the tetartos (δ') in the second ring. From here the metrophonia might descend two steps clockwise to the plagios devteros (πλ β'). According to the trochos system Chrysanthos' adaptation to the Ottoman tambur frets was already a transposition.

Nearly every melos is related to the heptaphonia by the reproduction of the plagios in the octave of the eighth phthongos. This practice separated the four octaves. Hence, the Hagiopolitan phthorai nana and nenano had an important function to bridge between the four octaves of protos, devteros, tritos, and tetartos. The tritos and the tetartos octave were separated by different degrees, e.g. the tetartos octave C—c and the tritos one B flat—b flat was separated by the use of b natural on the seventh phthongos in the heptaphonia of tetartos. Manuel Chrysaphes mentioned that phthora nana always bound the melos of echos tritos, so that it had to resolve in the enharmonic form of echos plagios tetartos. Bound by the phthora nana, the melos could not change into any other echos before its resolution into the plagios tetartos, so even a change to the diatonic tetartos melos had to follow after this resolution and needed a preparation by the change to another genos (μεταβολή κατὰ γένος). In a very similar way the phthora nenano always connected the echos plagios devteros on E with the echos protos on a—in both directions and bridged by the chromatic genos.

The inner and outer nature of whatever phthongos becomes evident by the difference between parallage and melos. The great wheel in the center rather represented all phthongoi as an element of a tone system, but by the solfeggio of parallage each phthongos was defined on the level of dynamis (δύναμις) as an own echos according to a certain enechema. The four inner rings of the central wheel re-defined the dynamis of each phthongos constantly by the enechema of another echos, so each parallage defined the disposition of the intervals in another way, thus represented all possible transpositions as part of the outer nature. The inner nature was represented by the four peripheral wheels for protos (on the top left), devteros (on the top right), tritos (at the bottom left), and tetartos (at the bottom right). Within these circles each phthongos became part of a certain melos and its echos, so its function was defined as a modal degree of an echos, e.g. a cadential or final degree, or a mobile degree attracted by the others.

The practice of psaltic art and the disposition of the echoi through which a certain composition had to pass, can be studied by the kalophonic method of doing the thesis of the sticheraric melos. The psaltes skilled in the psaltic art usually opened his performance by an extended enechema which recapitulated the disposition of all the echoi which the kalophonic melos had to pass through. Usually the disposition was simple and did not change by the use of transposition, but some more complex stichera did as well and the tetraphonic system allowed always a new disposition between plagios and kyrios of a certain echos. And one of this complex stichera which pass through the eight echoi of Octoechos, was chosen by Oliver Strunk (1942) to find evidence for a fixed disposition of the eight echoi.

=== Ioannis Plousiadinos' parallage ===
There is an alternative form of solfeggio which was called "the wisest or rather sophisticated parallage of Mr Ioannis Iereos Plousiadinos" (ἡ σοφωτάτη παραλλαγὴ κυρίου Ἰωάννου Ἰερέως τοῦ Πλουσιαδηνοῦ). It uses a crossing point and three phthongoi into four directions. What makes this parallage wiser than the one of John Koukouzeles is simply, that it can be used for tetraphonia and for triphonia at the same time and without the use of any transposition. It does look for odd ways as well, how to change between the echoi (similar to the corrupted heptaphonia of the Koukouzelian wheel), but here the changes were rather based on more common combinations of different tetrachords mixing the diatonic with the chromatic or enharmonic genus.

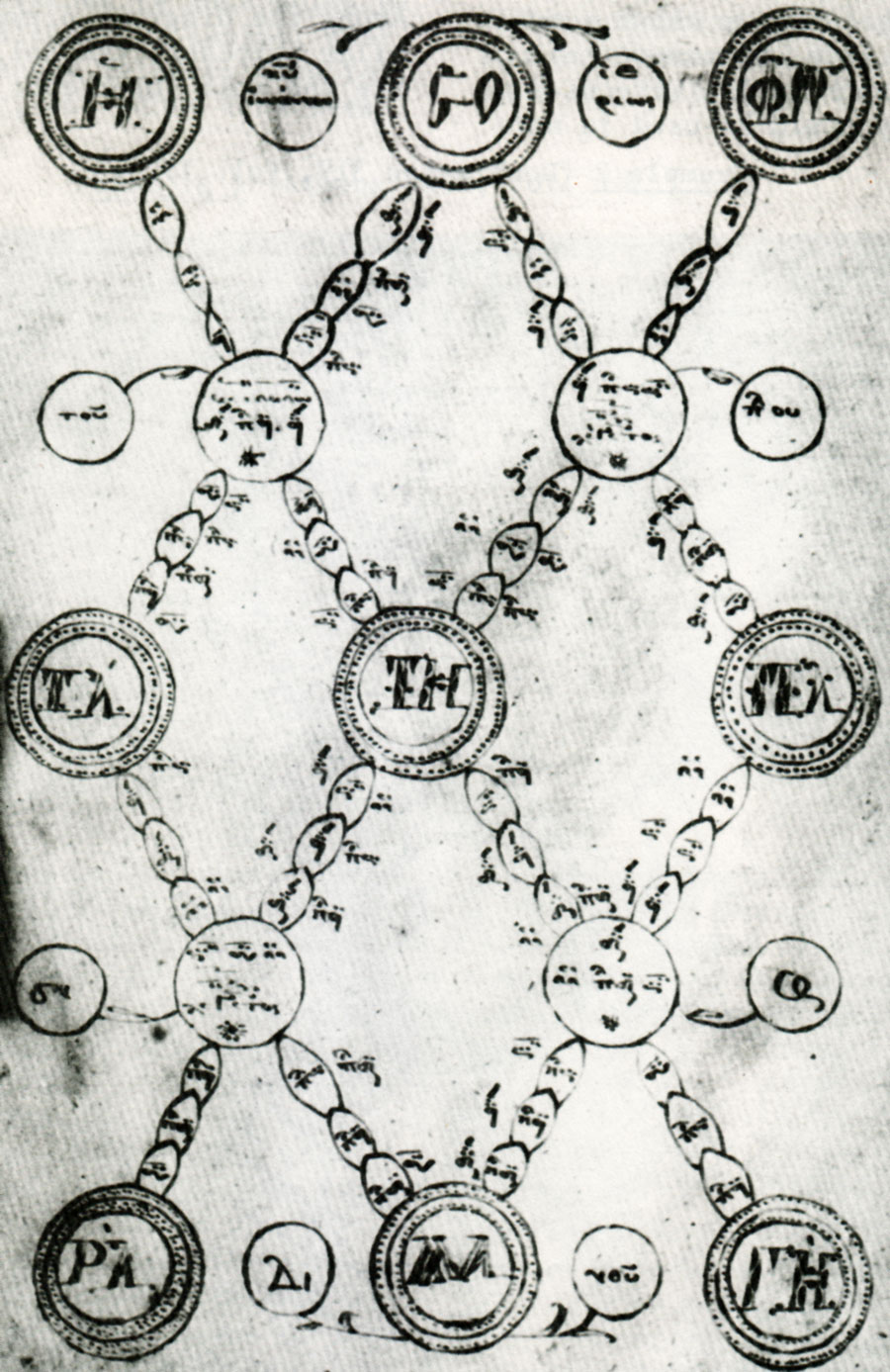
"ἡ σοφωτάτη παραλλαγὴ κυρίου Ἰωάννου Ἰερέως τοῦ Πλουσιαδηνοῦ" in an 18th-century manuscript (GR-AOdo Ms. 319, fol. 18v)

The diagram consist of 4 separated X-shaped chains or crosses, each of them have a major circle in the center for the pitch class (phthongos) which connects the two branches on the left (or on the right side) of the cross. For the beginning it is enough to understand, that the four crosses are ascribed to the phthongos at the crossing point like protos, devteros, tritos and tetartos which correspond to the four peripheral circles of the Koukouzelian wheel. They can also be regarded from a different angle as four rhombs which connect two neighbouring phthongoi at the crossing point, because the phthongoi on the top and on the bottom between two crosses meet within each rhomb. In its very particular shape, Plousiadinos' diagram less represents the correct order of one tone system like the Koukouzelian wheel and the trochos system, but it helps the singer to explore rather hidden paths which pass between the different tone systems.

==== The triphonia of phthora nana at the tritos and tetartos cross ====
In this diagram the enharmonic triphonia can be found as part of the tritos and the tetartos rhomb, between the crosses at the bottom left and right, and as part of the fourth between the right part of cross at the bottom right, and the left part of the cross at the top left.

The simplest case is the triphonia between plagios tetratos and tritos which can be imagined as a repeating chain of tetrachords between Do—Fa. It has its finalis between a descending and an ascending tetrachord which are connected by the finalis—the crossing point. Here the complication is similar to those between heptaphonia and tetraphonia. The simplest form of triphonia was like as a permanent transposition of each tetrachord which always start on plagios tetartos (πλ δ') and ascends until the phthongos of tritos (γ'), passing through the tetrachord πλ δ῾, α῾, β῾, and finally γ῾ within three steps (τρεις φωναὶ, τριφωνία). The final note is always tritos and plagios tetartos at the same time (γ' = πλ δ').

In fact the ascending right branch from the x at the bottom left continues from the phthongos of tritos (γ') in the center up to the phthongos of devteros (β'), but another signature of tritos (γ') is written aside as an alternative annotation of the same phthongos.

This parallage corresponds to a certain convention in the use of notation. Without any sign the parallage follows the tetraphonia γ῾, δ῾, α῾, and finally β῾, as written within the chain of pitches or phthongoi. A parallage within the triphonic tone system has to be indicated by the use of the aphonic or great sign xeron klasma (ξηρὸν κλάσμα), like it is used in Mega Ison (see the sign added in red ink in the picture below, beginning of the third row at the syllable ἀνάσταμα). This sign used three steps above the phthongos γ῾ indicates, that here there will be the same cadence which usually closes on the phthongos of tritos, instead of the phthongos of devteros. Hence, the triphonic parallage will be used which descends from the top of the branch γ῾, πλ β῾, πλ α', down to πλ δ῾, which is in the center of the right cross at the bottom—the one of tetartos, if we come down from the right branch. Nevertheless, it has already turned to the tritos in the left or third cross, represented by the νανὰ intonation or its plagal form: echos varys or "grave mode" (υαρ).

Within the tetraphonic parallage, singers will always find a diminished tritone on a slightly low intoned b natural, whenever they ascends three steps up from the tritos on F. Only the triphonic system finds again the tritos at a phthongos within the pure fourth of a tetrachord, which must be b flat.

In the same way the last phthongos of the descending branch down to the phthongos of "plagios tetartos" is alternatively annotated as "echos varys" (υαρ), while the tritos in the crossing point has the signature of phthora nana (φθορά νανὰ) which can be found between two connected tetrachords: between plagios tetartos and tritos (C—F νανὰ—b flat) or between varys and tritos (F—b flat νανὰ—e flat).

==== The triphonia of echos legetos or mesos tetartos ====
The left half of the same third cross means a completely different interval combination. Here the triphonia moves in ascending as well as in descending direction a middle tone and two great tones from a pitch which is a mesos tetartos on a low E which moves the middle tone (D—E) very close to the small one (E—F). The signature at the crossing point abbreviates "echos legetos" (ἦχος λέγετος). If the intervall step between the phthongoi protos and devteros is a diese (like the Latin semitonium), the diminished tritone (B flat—low E, low E—a) becomes a tetrachord (B flat—E flat νανὰ, E flat νανὰ—a flat). It just depends which signature of the crossing point has been chosen by the psaltes and whether they took the left or the right branch.

Nevertheless, the triphonic parallage which is ascribed to Ioannis Plousiadinos is used in combination with all the chromatic and enharmonic phthorai which can be used within all the eight diatonic modes of the octoechos.

==== The triphonia between phthora nenano and the echos protos or the echos tetartos ====
Another example is the first cross on the left top with the modal signatures of protos, tetartos and phthora nenano (φθορά νενανῶ). According to medieval signatures, this phthora connected the echos protos (ἦχος πρῶτος) with the echos plagios tou devterou (ἦχος πλάγιος τοῦ δευτέρου). If only this tetrachord is chromatic, it is connected to a second diatonic tetrachord between α' and δ', so the signature is protos. In the current tradition the sticheraric melos the tetrachord between α' and δ' is chromatic, so the attraction of νενανῶ moves towards the tetartos, and between δ' and the tetartos octave of the plagios, the diatonic melos follows echos tetartos . In fact, the melos of echos tetartos within the tetrachord G—c today tends to choose the tetartos melos for the ascending direction (δ'—α'—β'—πλ δ'), and the protos melos for the descending parallage (δ'—υαρ—πλ β'—πλ α'). The chromatic alternative is tetraphonic and no longer part of this diagram.

Both possibilities were certainly well known in the time of the manuscript Ms. 319 of the Docheiarios Monastery, but if the ascription to Ioannis Plousiadinos is correct, it was already practice during the 15th century. There are some descriptions of the nenano phthora by Manuel Chrysaphes which point to a use of phthora nenano based on δ' as the mesos devteros and transposed on γ' as mesos protos:

καὶ οὕτος ἕχει, ἀλλ οὐ συνίσταται πάντοτε εἰς τὸν πρῶτον ἦχον τὸ μέλος αὐτῆς, ἀλλὰ πολλάκις δεσμοῦσα καὶ τὸν τρίτον ποιεῖ τοῦτον νενανῶ, ὁμοίως καὶ τὸν τέταρτον· ἐνίοτε καὶ τὸν δεύτερον καὶ τὸν πλάγιον τετάρτου. πλὴν ἡ κατάληξις ταύτης γίνεται πάντοτε εἰς τὸν πλάγιον δευτέρου, κἂν εἰς ὁποῖον ἦχον καὶ τεθῇ, καθὼς διδάσκει καὶ ποιεῖ τοῦτο ὁ ἀληθὴς εὐμουσώτατος διδάσκαλος μαΐστωρ Ἰωάννης εἰς τὸ "Μήποτε ὀργισθῆ κύριος" ἐν τῷ "Δουλεύσατε"· τετάρτου γὰρ ἤχου ὄντος ἐκεῖ ἀπὸ παραλλαγῶν, δεσμεῖ τοῦτον ἡ φθορὰ αὕτη καὶ ἀντὶ τοῦ κατελθεῖν πλάγιον πρώτου, κατέρχεταιεἰς τὸν πλάγιον δευτέρου.

And this is the situation, but its melody [μέλος] does not always belong to the first mode for frequently, by binding the third mode also, it makes it nenano, likewise the fourth plagal mode. However, no matter in which mode it is used, its resolution [κατάληξις] takes place in the second plagal mode [τὸν πλάγιον δευτέρου], just as the truly most musically-accomplished teacher and maistor Ioannes teaches and writes in Μήποτε ὀργισθῆ κύριος in the Δουλεύσατε. For since the fourth mode is there by parallage [ἀπὸ παραλλαγῶν], the phthora binds it, and instead of moving to the first plagal [ἀντὶ τοῦ κατελθεῖν πλάγιον πρώτου], it continues to the second plagal.

Both possibilities, the phthora nenano ending as the plagios devteros and ending as the plagios protos, are indicated in the right descending branch of the first cross. In the current practice in which the plagios devteros ends on the phthongos of plagios protos (πλ α' on D), but is chromatic according to the description of the chromatic tetrachord division of phthora nenano. The metabole kata tonon as it was still described by Manuel Chrysaphes, has become common practice today.

The second (legetos/devteros) and fourth cross (phthora nana) display other possibilities which have been already discussed here.

=== Mega Ison ===
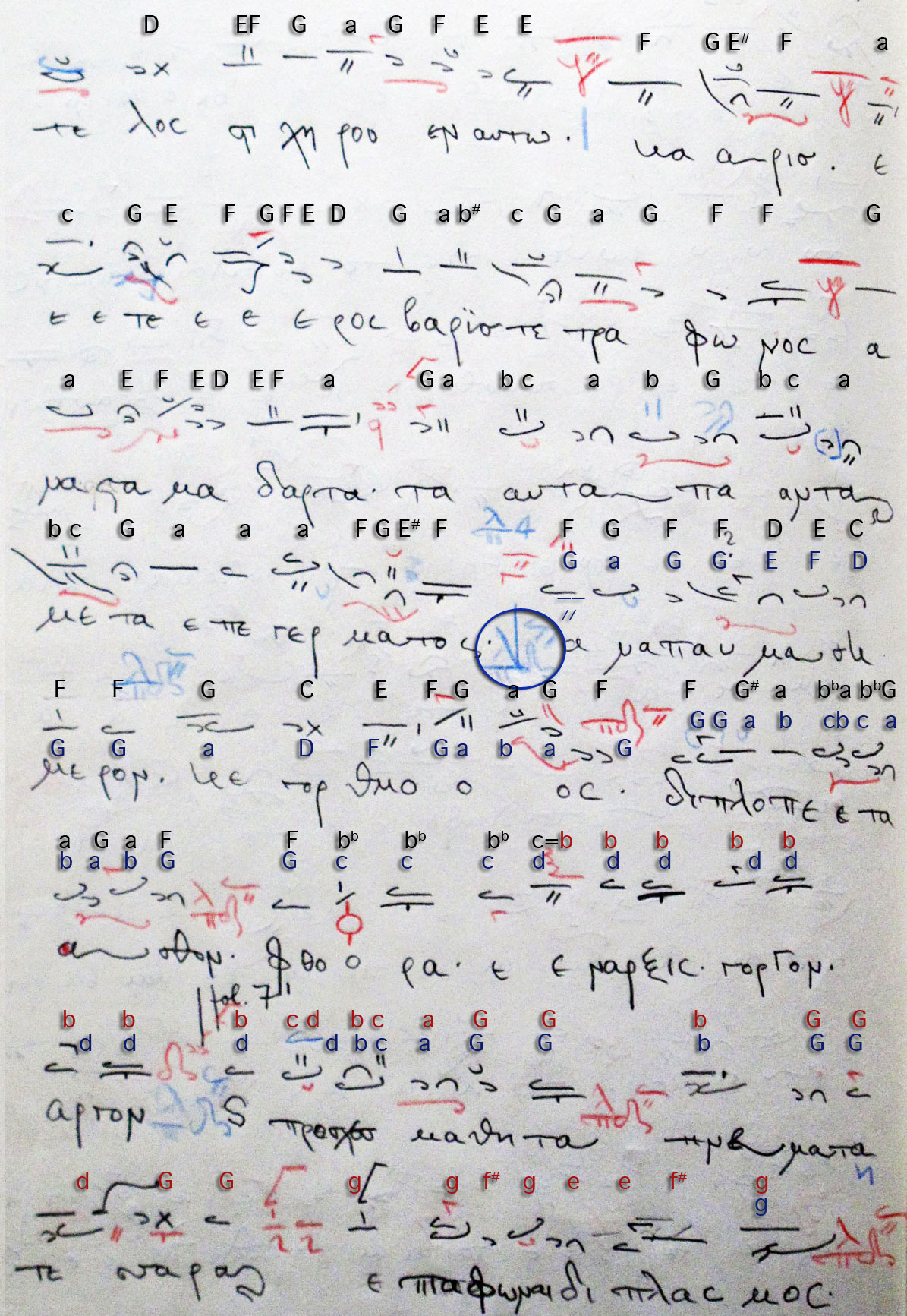
Section echos varys and echos plagios tou tetartou of John Koukouzeles' Mega Ison (transcription of V-CVbav Cod. Ottob. gr. 317, fol. 5v-7v and—as variants written in blue—Cod. Vat. gr. 791, fol. 3v-5)

The Papadikai, their signs, phthorai, diagrams, and detailed explanations are hard to understand, especially for readers who were not well skilled in the psaltic art. In order to understand them in practice, didactic chants or "exercises" (μαθήματα) were added as practical illustrations. Among them, there was probably no exercise which taught so many things at the same time than the mathema called "Mega Ison", which was originally composed by John Glykys and revised by John Koukouzeles, a protopsaltes of the next generation and probably a student of the former.

In order to demonstrate the transitional function of the trochos system, this mathema passed through all echoi of the octoechos, but at the same time it even demonstrated the changes to the other tone systems (μεταβολαὶ κατὰ σύστημα).

The use of the three tone systems heptaphonia, tetraphonia, and triphonia, and how they can be combined by different changes, can be illustrated by a short analysis of the end of Mega Ison, before echos varys (ἦχος βαρύς) is resolved into the echos plagios tou tetartou (ἦχος πλάγιος τοῦ τετάρτου). A comparison and critical edition of Mega Ison shows that the oldest versions did not use any transpositions (μεταβολαὶ κατὰ τόνον), while the adaptation to the modern practice has to be studied by the exegesis of Petros Peloponnesios and its transcription into modern neumes according to the New Method.

Until the 19th century the medium of written transmission had been chant manuscripts. This explains why several manuscripts like sticheraria and Papadikai offer different solutions which had been found by various protopsaltes as a solution of the same problems, so that even medial signatures could be different within the same traditional composition. In this respect Maria Alexandru's "approaches towards a critical edition" are quite helpful, because a comparison assumes that the didactic chant Mega Ison had been originally untransposed, while there are enough later versions which need several transpositions (μεταβολαὶ κατὰ τόνον).

The section of echos plagios tou devterou (ἦχος πλάγιος τοῦ δευτέρου) is the longest and most complex one and it has some medial signatures for the phthora nenano which is resolved frequently, especially when it is used before the great sign chorevma (χόρευμα, Νο. 39 & 40) which usually prepares a cadence before a transition to phthora nana. But here, by the end of the plagios devteros section, there is a plagios protos cadence marked by the name of the great sign thema haploun (θέμα ἁπλοῦν, No. 49) which is finally resolved into its mesos the echos varys. Manuel Chrysaphes wrote about this resolution of phthora nenano:

Εἰ δὲ διὰ δεσμὸν τέθειται ἡ φθορὰ αὕτη, γίνεται οὕτως. ὁ πρῶτος ἦχος πολλάκις τετραφωνῶν γίνεται δεύτερος ἀπὸ μέλους. ποιεῖ δὲ τοῦτο ἡ τῆς δευτέρου ἤχου φθορᾶς δύναμις. εἰ γὰρ μὴ ἐτίθετο φθορὰ εἰς τὸν πρῶτον, κατήρχετο εἰς τὸν μέσον αὐτοῦ τὸν βαρύν.

If this phthora is used in order to bind [δεσμὸν], it functions as follows: the first mode, frequently tetraphonos, becomes the second by melody [δεύτερος ἀπὸ μέλους] this effected by the strength of phthora of the second mode [τῆς δευτέρου ἤχου φθορᾶς δύναμις]. If a phthora were not placed in the first mode, the melody would enter its mesos [τὸν μέσον], the Barys.

This is exactly what happens here and it explains, why the end of this section finishes in the diatonic genus unlike the exegesis of Mega Ison by Petros Peloponnesios, and it continues with the echos varys, the tonality of the new section. The beginning of this section emphasizes the tetraphonic melos of the diatonic echos varys, its characteristic is the tritone above the finalis within the tritos pentachord F, and the word "τετράφωνος" has the cadence formula of ἦχος βαρύς. At the sign epegerma (ἐπέγερμα, Νο. 55) is already the end of the varys section. Concerning the medial signature at this kolon the manuscripts do not agree. In the Papadike Ottoboniano greco Ms. 317 (fol. 7r) of the Vatican Library (see example) it is the signature of echos tritos (ἦχος τρίτος) on F which opens the lower ambitus of the tritos octave on B flat. The critical edition of Maria Alexandru continues to the beginning of the following section on G as plagios tetartos (ἦχος πλάγιος τοῦ τετάρτου), while the version indicated in blue follows the version of Vaticana greca Ms. 791, here the sign epegerma turns the phthongos on G into a tritos (already at the cadence marked by an apoderma) and prepares a plagios tetartos cadence according to the melos of phthora nana (νεἅγιε νανὰ) at the following kolon. Petros Peloponnesios follows here another great sign stavros (σταυρός) which can be only find in a few manuscripts, but it mediates between the different versions by preparing the section of plagios tetartos with an additional tetartos cadence on the phthongos G.

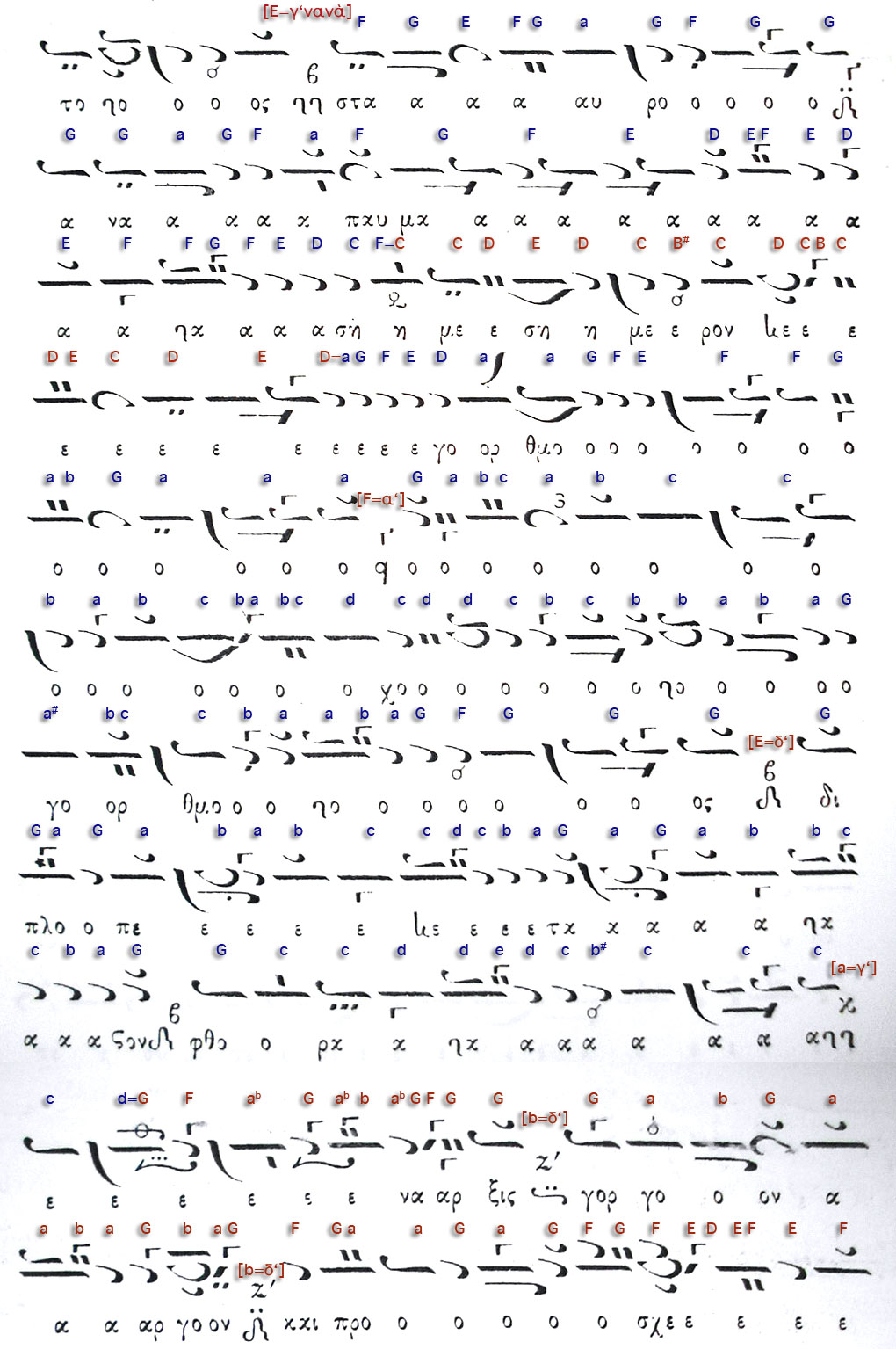
Petros Peloponnesios realization of Mega Ison according to the melos of the 18th century (Kyriazides 1896, 142-143)

In Ms. Ottob. grec. 317 the cadence of epegermatos is on the phthongos F and, as a phthora nana in the triphonic tone system, it becomes as well the phthongos of the tetartos octave based on its plagios. This version forces two phthorai, the one of tritos at the fourth degree (b flat) which would correspond to the triphonia of the "phthora" (nana), if F was still the phthongos of echos tritos (as the great sign epegerma once created it). And as well the following one of the fifth degree (c) which turns it into the kyrios devteros (b natural).

Both phthorai are not needed in the untransposed reconstruction of Alexandru's edition which finds the tetartos octave on G, on the fourth degree (c) the tritos and its kyrios (ἦχος τέταρτος) on the fifth degree of the mode. In the original version, the transformation of the plagios tetartos into the triphonic phthora nana happens not earlier than on its octave at "ἑπταφωναὶ δίπλασμος" (No. 64). It is a composed change of the tone system, which changes first from the tetraphonia ("πνεύματα τέσσαρα") of echos varys and echos plagios tetartos and arranges the tetartos octave on G which requires an f sharp as the seventh degree of the mode, nothing less than the alteration of the basis and finalis of the echos varys, the mode of the previous section. In a second step the lower octave on the phthongos G changes from the heptaphonic tone system of tetartos to the triphonic one of phthora nana, which places the finalis G as the connection between two tetrachords (D—E—F#—G—a—b natural—c) as it was taught by the "parallage of Ioannes Plousiadinos".

Petros Peloponnesios' version, as it was transcribed into the printed books by the beginning of the 19th century, is indeed closer to the rather odd interpretation of the scribe in Ms. ottob. gr. 317. But he introduced the interpretation of F as phthongos of the plagios tetartos in a more elegant way which was possible thanks to the triphonic tone system of the melos of echos varys (in a certain way the elegant way was simply a thesis of the papadic melos of this version). After the cadence in the diatonic tetartos on G at stavros, the plagios tetartos section starts rather in the triphonic melos of echos nana, which was not used during the varys section of the untransposed original version. At "(ἀνάπαυμα) σήμερον" (No. 56) the phthongos of varys F is simply taken as the melos of plagios tetartos (νεἅγιε νανὰ) which turns the former phthongos of tetartos G into the one of protos. Hence, C and G are indeed perceived as the protos pentachord D-a like in the untransposed version of Vat. gr. 791, so the former phthongos of echos varys turns finally into the one of echos plagios tetartos ("γορθμός", No. 57). In Ms. ottob. gr. 317 the cadence on F which was marked by the medial signature of plagios tetartos, points to a mesos devteros, in Petros Peloponnesios' realization it is prepared by the formula of the cadence used for echos tetartos (ἦχος τέταρτος), but in the very end slightly modified towards the formula of phthora nana. Even the diatonic phthora for the echos devteros ("ἔναρχις", No. 60) was integrated by Petros Peloponnesios, but as mesos devteros in the soft chromatic genos which corrects the change to the triphonia of the great sign phthora ("φθορά", No. 59) which was in fact as the diatonic phthora of echos tritos once separated from the enharmonic melos of the phthora nana, unlike the melos of the echos tritos in the current tradition. Already in the parallage of the 18th century it was memorized by the name "νανὰ", not by its former name "ἀνέανες" (see the tritos enechema).

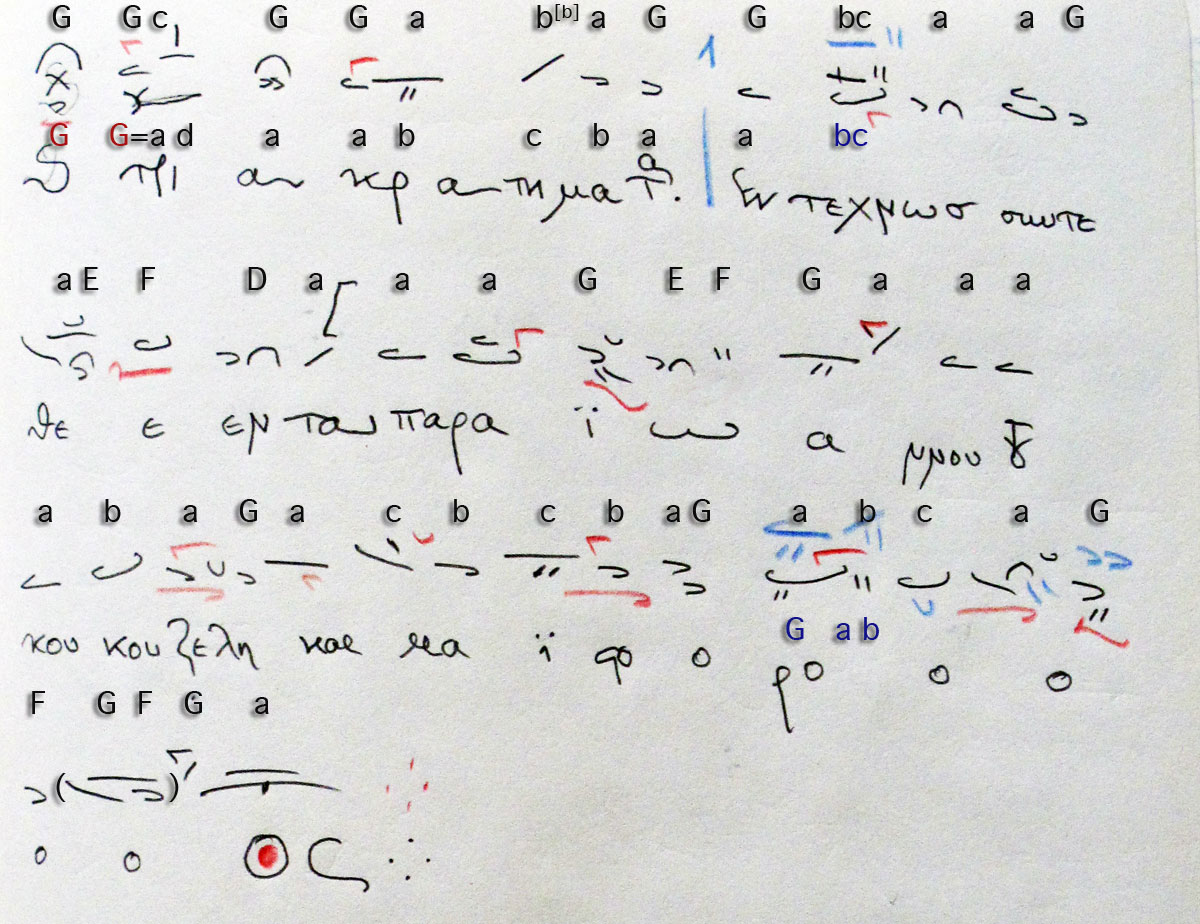
Conclusion (ἦχος πρῶτος) of John Koukouzeles' Mega Ison (transcription of V-CVbav Ms. Ottob. gr. 317, fol. 5v-7v & Cod. Vat. gr. 791, fol. 3v-5)

Until now the version of Ms. vat. gr. 791 was not identical, but closer to Maria Alexandru's reconstruction (see the change of the melody indicated by the phonic signs in Ms. ottob. grec. 317 at "προσχές μάθητα"). This changes within the end of the plagios tetartos, the medial signature of the phthongos g as plagios tetartos was obviously no longer interpreted as a metabole kata systema (μεταβολή κατὰ σύστημα), but as a change from the enharmonic genos of phthora nana to the diatonic genos within the echos plagios tou tetartou (ἦχος πλάγιος τοῦ τετάρτου) or better the echos tetartos on G within the tetartos octave on C. Protopsaltes of the 18th century already used the lower alteration of the seventh degree of the mode, so that the tetartos melos could have been mistaken for that of protos (G=a). This is the only justification for the modification of the traditional model which can be found at the beginning of the last section of echos protos

The comparison of different manuscript sources shows, that rather odd interpretations of Mega Ison in certain Papadike manuscripts had been important milestones towards the transcription of Petros Peloponnesios' realization of the John Koukouzeles' mathema. His own transposition from the varys section on did no longer allow him to leave the labyrinth of the Octoechos and its various connections based on ambiguities of modal perception. Even if it was no longer perceived by the audience, it becomes evident during the study of the manuscripts that the protopsaltes got lost in the labyrinth without finding their back to the exit of the same transposition. Even skilled experts got easily lost in the very sophisticated psaltic art as it had been taught by the Papadike over the centuries.

== Music of the Phanariotes ==
There is another possible point of view concerning the 19th-century chant reform than the simplification of the former Byzantine notation, its Papadic tradition of teaching, essentially based on the many signs memorized by the didactic chant Mega Ison. Greek musicians of the Ottoman Empire, especially those who lived in sea ports like Istanbul, in the Fener district in particular (phanariotes), did not only sing in the churches the daily services, they also joined Sufi lodges, and sometimes even the Court as invited guests but also as paid musicians, and it is known from several musicians that Sufis and Christians went to the synagogue to listen to Jewish singers and vice versa. Among Jewish singers, the brotherhoods of the "Maftirim" (of Edirne, but also of Galata) were of particular interest, because they adapted classical Ottoman makam compositions not only to Piyyutim poetry, but also to Hebrew psalms, and these compositions had been organized as a cycle of the same makam, chosen as makam of the day. These inspiring exchanges developed other needs like the adaptation to a tone system which was common knowledge of all musicians of the Ottoman Empire, which allowed to understand makamlar within the system of the octoechos tradition or without it as so-called "exoteric music" or "external music" (ἡ μουσική ἐξωτερική). Some signs of the former Byzantine notation were too specific concerning the own tradition, so that they were abandoned. Thus, the ornamentation became part of the oral transmission, whether it was makam or a certain melos of an echos, and thus, a new more universal notation was created which had been even used to notate primitive models of Western polyphony, despite it had been developed over centuries to notate very complex forms of monodic chant.

Phanariotes, Armenian musicians as well as Danubian Boyars were the first, who invented different notation systems to transcribe the orally based music traditions of the Ottoman Empire, while Greek treatises still tended to reformulate passages taken from the Hagiopolites treatise. Even before the invention of the universal New Method and its various new phthorai used for certain makamlar and named after them, the traditional explanation for the transcription of makamlar was just another demonstration of the integrative function, that Byzantine Round notation had already developed before the Papadic reform. The phthorai itself played a central role, as "destroyers" they marked a transition between the "internal" (ἐσωτερική) and "external music" (ἐξωτερική). This way Greek musicians could use the interval structure (διαστήματα) of a certain makam for a temporary change (ἡ ἐναλλαγή μερική) which was not at all a proper melos within the octoechos system, but rather a refined way of a transition between two echoi. But developing its own architecture within a section sung over abstract syllables (teretismata, nenanismata, etc.), it could soon develop its own proper melos as an echos kratema like phthora nana and phthora nenano before.

In practice the integrative process was not so controlled as the Papadic theory and its Hagiopolitan reformulations suggested it. Several liturgical compositions had been made entirely in certain makamlar and were certainly in no way "external music", and the used makam was not always specified explicitly.

After first attempts to transcribe traditional music, the earliest compositions of church music dealing partly with mele beyond the octoechos system are probably those by Petros Bereketis (about 1665–1725), a protopsaltes who became very famous especially for his contributions to the Heirmologion kalophonikon (the heirmologion elaborated according to the psaltic art), despite the fact that he was never directly connected with the Patriarchate. Some of his heirmologic compositions like Πασᾶν τὴν ἐλπίδα μοῦ use several makam models for extravagant changes between different echoi, at least in the later transcriptions according to the New Method and its "exoteric phthorai". This early use corresponds to the early state of a phthora which is rather a model of modulation or transition between different echoi than an exposition of a proper melos that can be perceived as an own echos. Nevertheless, it was already used for Orthodox chant and not for compositions in Ottoman makam genres.

During the 18th century, models dedicated to a certain makam (seyirler) were already collected in the manuscript by Kyrillos Marmarinos and were later organized according to the Octoechos order like the great signs in the mathema "Mega Ison". An example is the edition of Panagiotes Keltzanides' "Methodical teaching of the theory and practice for the instruction and the dissemination of the genuine external music" which was published in 1881. The seventh chapter of Keltzanides' book contains an introduction into all the "exoteric phthorai" of the New Method used for more than 40 makamlar ordered according to the Octoechos and the Turkish fret name of the basis tone. The following "Makamlar kâr" memorizes each seyir with a text naming the makam of each section. This genre, called ἔντεχνον μάθημα, is very close to the "Mega Ison" and the use of modern Byzantine notation, which does not use the specific rhythmic notation developed for the usulümler, but memorizes the makamlar systematically without a cyclic form returning at the end to the tonality of the beginning. The composition starts with the diatonic makam rast and finishes in the chromatic makam suz-i dil. A relation between makamler and usulümler in the genre semaï is taught in a second didactic chant "Makamlar semaïsi" (pp. 200-204). The earlier anthologies rather adapted Ottoman than Byzantine Papadic forms, for instance the Mecmua ("Journal")—a kind of Ottoman Divan ordered according of the makamlar and their concert cycles (fasıl).

== See also ==
- Hagiopolitan and Neobyzantine Octoechos
- Byzantine Music—traditional music of the Byzantine Empire
- Jewish music—the Sephardic tradition of the Levante
- Mevlevi Order—whirling dervishes and their Makam tradition
- Ottoman classical music—about all music traditions of the Ottoman Empire
- Protopsaltes (Domestikos, Lampadarios)—ranks of psaltes in charge of the Patriarchate

=== People ===
- Dimitrie Cantemir—Boyar, ethnologist, geographer and musician of the Ottoman Empire (17th century)
- Israel Najara—Sephardic mystic, piyyut, and rabbi of the Ottoman Empire (late 16th century)
- Wojciech Bobowski—alias Ali Ufki, Polish musician and dragoman at the Ottoman court (17th century)

== Theoretical sources ==
=== Papadikai (14th–18th century) ===
- "Hiera Mone of Timios Prodromos (Skete) Veroias, Ms. 1". Papadike (1796). 1796. Archived from the original on 30 November 2010.
- Alexandrescu, Ozana (2011). "Tipuri de gramatici în manuscrise muzicale de tradiţie bizantină". Studii şi Cercetări de Istoria Artei. Teatru, Muzică, Cinematografie. Serie novă. 49–50: 21–55.
- Alexandru, Maria (1996). "Koukouzeles' Mega Ison: Ansätze einer kritischen Edition" (PDF). Cahiers de l'Institut du Moyen-Âge Grec et Latin. 66: 3–23.
- Conomos, Dimitri, ed. (1985), The Treatise of Manuel Chrysaphes, the Lampadarios: [Περὶ τῶν ἐνθεωρουμένων τῇ ψαλτικῇ τέχνῃ καὶ ὧν φρουνοῦσι κακῶς τινες περὶ αὐτῶν] On the Theory of the Art of Chanting and on Certain Erroneous Views that some hold about it (Mount Athos, Iviron Monastery MS 1120, July 1458), Monumenta Musicae Byzantinae - Corpus Scriptorum de Re Musica, vol. 2, Vienna: Verlag der Österreichischen Akademie der Wissenschaften, ISBN 978-3-7001-0732-3.
- Fleischer, Oskar, ed. (1904), "Die Papadike von Messina", Die spätgriechische Tonschrift, Neumen-Studien, vol. 3, Berlin: Georg Reimer, pp. 15–50, fig. B3–B24 [Papadike of the Codex Chrysander].
- Hannick, Christian; Wolfram, Gerda, eds. (1997), Die Erotapokriseis des Pseudo-Johannes Damaskenos zum Kirchengesang, Monumenta Musicae Byzantinae - Corpus Scriptorum de Re Musica, vol. 5, Vienna: Verlag der Österreichischen Akademie der Wissenschaften, ISBN 978-3-7001-2520-4.
- Hannick, Christian; Wolfram, Gerda, eds. (1985), Gabriel Hieromonachus: [Περὶ τῶν ἐν τῇ ψαλτικῇ σημαδίων καὶ τῆς τούτων ἐτυμολογίας] Abhandlung über den Kirchengesang, Monumenta Musicae Byzantinae - Corpus Scriptorum de Re Musica, vol. 1, Vienna: Verlag der Österreichischen Akademie der Wissenschaften, ISBN 978-3-7001-0729-3.
- Petros Peloponnesios (1896). Kyriazides, Agathangelos (ed.). "Τὸ Μέγα Ἴσον τῆς Παπαδικῆς μελισθὲν παρὰ Ἰωάννου Μαΐστορος τοῦ Κουκκουζέλη". Ἐν Ἄνθος τῆς καθ' ἡμᾶς Ἐκκλησιαστικῆς Μουσικῆς περιέχον τὴν Ἀκολουθίαν τοῦ Ἐσπερίνου, τοῦ Ὅρθρου καὶ τῆς Λειτουργίας μετὰ καλλοφωνικῶν Εἴρμων μελοποιηθὲν παρὰ διάφορων ἀρχαιῶν καὶ νεωτερῶν Μουσικόδιδασκαλων: 127–144.
- Tardo, Lorenzo (1938), "Papadiche", L'antica melurgia bizantina, Grottaferrata: Scuola Tipografica Italo Orientale "S. Nilo", pp. 151–163.

=== Theory of the Phanariotes ===
- Chrysanthos of Madytos (1832), Θεωρητικὸν μεγὰ τῆς Μουσικῆς, Triest: Michele Weis.
- Anastasiou, Spiridon; Keïvelis, Ioannis G. (1856). Απάνθισμα ή Μεδζμουαϊ μακαμάτ περιέχον μεν διάφορα τουρκικά άσματα. Istanbul: Taddaios Tividesian.
- Keltzanides, Panagiotes (1881). Μεθοδική διδασκαλία θεωρητική τὲ καὶ πρακτική πρὸς ἐκμάθησιν καὶ διάδοσιν τοῦ γνησίου ἐξωτερικοῦ μέλους τῆς καθ᾿ ἡμᾶς Ἑλληνικῆς Μουσικῆς κατ᾿ ἀντιπαράθεσιν πρὸς τὴν Ἀραβοπερσικήν. Istanbul: Koromela & Sons.

== Middle Byzantine Chant manuscripts (13th–18th century) ==
=== Akolouthiai ===
- "Athens, Εθνική Βιβλιοθήκη της Ελλάδος [Ethnike Vivliotheke tes Hellados], Ms. 2458". Taxis ton akolouthion written in Constantinople (1336).
- "Athens, National Library of Greece, Ms. 2061". Akolouthiai of the Hagia Sophia of Thessalonica (early 15th century).
- Koukouzeles, Ioannes; Korones, Xenos; Kladas, Ioannes. "Vienna, Österreichische Nationalbibliothek, Cod. theol. gr. 185". Βιβλίον σὺν Θεῷ ἁγίῳ περιέχον τὴν ἄπασαν ἀκολουθίαν τῆς ἐκκλησιαστικῆς τάξεως συνταχθὲν παρὰ τοῦ μαΐστορος κυροῦ Ἰωάννου τοῦ Κουκουζέλη of Thessalonica (about 1400).
- "Athens, National Library of Greece, Ms. 2406". Akolouthiai with Papadike with methodoi, Anthology for Hesperinos, Orthros, and for the divine Liturgies, and Mathematarion (1453).

=== Old Sticheraria ===
- "Paris, Bibliothèque nationale, fonds grec, Ms. 355". Complete Menaion with Middle Byzantine notation (ff. 7r-326v) of the Sticherarion with various additions at the end and at the beginning (13th century).
- "Paris, Bibliothèque nationale, fonds grec, Ms. 265". Incomplete Sticherarion (parts replaced later) with Menaion, Triodion with Prosomoia, Pentekostarion, and Oktoechos (13th century).
- "Copenhagen, Det kongelige Bibliotek, Ms. NkS 4960, 4°". Complete Sticherarion with Menaion, Triodion, Pentekostarion, and Oktoechos (14th century).
- "Paris, Bibliothèque nationale, fonds grec, Ms. 261". Complete Sticherarion with Byzantine Round notation of Cyprus (Menaion ff. 1r-139r; Triodion ff. 141r-179r; Ἀκολουθία τῶν παθῶν ff. 179r-196v; Pentekostarion ff. 196v-218r) and Oktoechos with stichera prosomoia (14th century with later palimpsests around the stichera heothina).
- "Rome, Biblioteca apostolica vaticana, Cod. Ottob. gr. 380". Complete Sticherarion with Menaion, Triodion, Pentekostarion, and Oktoechos with prosomoia (late 14th century).
- "Cambridge, Trinity College, Ms. B.11.17". Complete Sticherarion with Menaion, Triodion, Pentekostarion and Oktoechos with Prosomoia of the Athonite Pantokrator Monastery (ca. 1400).
- "Bologna, Biblioteca del Liceo Musicale, Ms. P.147 (olim Cod. 155)". Triodion of the Old Sticherarion, partly damaged - Cod. 155 of Padre Martini's Manuscript Collection (16th century). Bologna: Museo internazionale e Biblioteca della musica di Bologna.

=== Old Heirmologia ===
- "Sinai, Saint Catherine's Monastery, Ms. Gr. 1258". Incomplete Greek Heirmologion in ode order (OdO, starts with the eighth odes of echos devteros, the notated part finishes at f. 144v, it follows an appendix with later additions) with Middle Byzantine notation (1257).
- "London, British Library, Ms. Add. 39611". Heirmologion mostly in canon order (KaO without first section of Heirmoi in echos protos) written near Saint Catherine's monastery (17th century). British Library.

=== Kontakaria ===
- "Saint-Petersburg, Rossiyskaya natsional'naya biblioteka, Ms. Q.п.I.32". Nižegorodsky Kondakar' of the Blagoveščensky [Annunciation] Monastery, introduced, described and transcribed by Tatiana Shvets (about 1200).
- "Paris, Bibliothèque nationale, fonds grec, ms. 397". Kontakarion (13th century).
- "Rome, Biblioteca apostolica vaticana, Vat. gr. 1606". Kontakarion-Psaltikon with Asmatikon (kontakia and hypakoai, allelouiaria, prokeimena, koinonika) with Middle Byzantine Round notation of the Archimandritate SS. Salvatore of Messina (13th century).
- "Sinai, Saint Catherine's Monastery, Ms. Gr. 1280". Psaltikon (Prokeimena, Allelouiaria, Hypakoai, Anti-cherouvikon for the Liturgy of Presanctified Gifts) and Kontakarion (menaion with integrated movable cycle) with Middle Byzantine round notation written in a monastic context (13th century).
- "Rome, Biblioteca apostolica vaticana, Vat. gr. 345". Kontakarion-Psaltikon (prokeimena, allelouiaria, hypakoai, kontakia) with Middle Byzantine Round notation (13th century).
- "Sinai, Saint Catherine's Monastery, Ms. Gr. 1314". Psaltikon-Kontakarion (prokeimena, allelouiaria, kontakarion with integrated hypakoai, hypakoai anastasima, the complete Akathistos hymn, kontakia anastasima, stichera heothina, appendix with refrains of the allelouiaria in oktoechos order) written by monk Neophyte (mid 14th century).

=== Mathemataria and Sticheraria kalophonika ===
- Koukouzeles, Ioannes. "London, British Library, Ms. Add. 28821". Menaion (interrupted by hymns of the Triodion and Pentekostarion, and by an old sticherarion fragment) of a Sticherarion kalophonikon with compositions by Ioannes Glykys, John Koukouzelis, Ioannes Kladas, Xenos Korones, Manuel Chrysaphes, Gregorios Mpounes Alyates and some later composers (17th century).
- Chrysaphes, Manuel. "London, British Library, Ms. Sloane 4087". Fragment of a Mathematarion of Theotokia, but not organised in oktoechos order with five kalophonic compositions by Manuel Chrysaphes and Ioannes Lampadarios (17th century).

=== Anthologies of the Papadike ===
- Panagiotes the New Chrysaphes. "London, British Library, Harley Ms. 1613". Anthologia with Byzantine composers (Anastasimatarion, Ainoi, Pasapnoaria & Prokeimena, Sticherarion and Leitourgika) (17th century). British Library.
- Panagiotes the New Chrysaphes. "London, British Library, Harley Ms. 5544". Papadike and the Anastasimatarion of Chrysaphes the New, and an incomplete Anthology for the Divine Liturgies (17th century). British Library.
- "Island of Syme, Archeio Demogerontias, Ms. 334". Anthology of the Papadike with methods, Kratematarion and Mathematarion written by Ioannes Trapezountios in Constantinople (about 1765).
- "Island of Syme, Archeio Demogerontias, Ms. 335". Anthology of the Papadike with methods, Kratematarion and Mathematarion written by Ioannes Trapezountios in Constantinople (about 1765).
- "London, British Library, Ms. Add. 19456". Papadike and Anthologia (Anoixontarion, Anastasimatarion, Polyeleoi, and Leitourgika) (18th century). British Library. Archived from the original on 2021-03-27.
- "Bucharest, Stavropoleos Monastery, Ms. 52". Papadike and Anthologia (Kekragarion, Doxologiai, Pasapnoarion, Cherouvikarion, Koinonikarion) (18th century). Stavropoleos Monastery.

== Studies ==
- Alexandru, Maria (2000). Studie über die 'großen Zeichen' der byzantinischen musikalischen Notation unter besonderer Berücksichtigung der Periode vom Ende des 12. bis Anfang des 19. Jahrhunderts. Universität Kopenhagen.
- Alexandru, Maria; Christian Troelsgård (2013). "The Development of a Didactic Tradition – The Elements of the Papadike". Tradition and Innovation in Late- and Postbyzantine Liturgical Chant II: Proceedings of the Congress held at Hernen Castle, the Netherlands, 30 October - 3 November 2008. Leuven, Paris, Walpole: Bredius Foundation, Peeters. pp. 1–57. ISBN 978-90-429-2748-3.
- Amargianakis, George (1977). An Analysis of Stichera in the Deuteros Modes: The Stichera idiomela for the Month of September in the Modes Deuteros, Plagal Deuteros, and Nenano; transcribed from the Manuscript Sinai 1230 <A.D. 1365>. Cahiers de l'Institut du Moyen-Âge Grec et Latin. Vol. 22–23. Copenhague: Univ.
- Atkinson, Charles M. (2008). The critical nexus: Tone-System, Mode, and Notation in Early Medieval Music. Oxford, New York [etc.]: Oxford University Press. ISBN 978-0-19-514888-6.
- Brandl, Rudolf Maria (1989). Elsner, Jürgen (ed.). "Konstantinopolitanische Makamen des 19. Jahrhunderts in Neumen: die Musik der Fanarioten". Maqam - Raga - Zeilenmelodik: Konzeptionen und Prinzipien der Musikproduktion. 1. Arbeitstagung der Study Group "maqām" Beim International Council for Traditional Music Vom 28. Juni Bis 2. Juli 1988 in Berlin: 156–169.
- Erol, Merıh (25 May 2008). "'External' music in Constantinople". Encyclopaedia of the Hellenic World, Constantinople.
- Frøyshov, Stig Simeon R. (2007). "The Early Development of the Liturgical Eight-Mode System in Jerusalem". Saint Vladimir's Theological Quarterly. 51: 139–178.
- Gerlach, Oliver (2009). Im Labyrinth des Oktōīchos – Über die Rekonstruktion mittelalterlicher Improvisationspraktiken in liturgischer Musik. Vol. 2. Berlin: Ison. ISBN 9783000323065.
- Gerlach, Oliver (2011). "Religious Chant in the late Ottoman Empire – Between Petros Bereketēs and Hamamîzade İsmail Dede Efendi". Studies of the Dark Continent in European Music History: Collected Essays on Traditions of Religious Chant in the Balkans. Rome: Aracne. pp. 81–110. ISBN 9788854838406.
- Gheorghiţă, Nicolae (2010). "Secular Music at the Romanian Princely Courts during the Phanariot Epoch (1711-1821)". Byzantine Chant between Constantinopole and the Danubian Principalities: Studies in Byzantine Musicology. Bucharest: Sophia. ISBN 978-973-136-227-4.
- Hannick, Christian, ed. (1991). Rhythm in Byzantine Chant – Acta of the Congress held at Hernen Castle in November 1986. Hernen: Bredius Foundation.
- Harris, Simon (2001). The 14th-Century Akolouthiae. Cantus planus: Papers read at the 9th meeting, Esztergom & Visegrád, 1998. Budapest: Magyar Tudomanyos Akademia. pp. 449–478.
- Husmann, Heinrich (1970). "Die oktomodalen Stichera und die Entwicklung des byzantinischen Oktoëchos". Archiv für Musikwissenschaft. 27 (4): 304–325. doi:10.2307/930047. JSTOR 930047.
- Joubran, Romanos Rabih (2009). "The Use of Eastern Musical Modes in Byzantine Compositions during the 19th and 20th Century". Proceedings of the 1st International Conference of the ASBMH (PDF). 1st International Conference of the ASBMH, 2007: Byzantine Musical Culture. Pittsburgh. pp. 530–553.
- Kalaitzidis, Kyriakos (2012). Post-Byzantine music manuscripts as a source for Oriental secular music (15th to early 19th century). Istanbuler Texte und Studien. Vol. 28. Kyriaki Koubaroulis, Dimitri Koubaroulis (trans.). Würzburg: Ergon. ISBN 978-3-89913-947-1.
- Makris, Eustathios (2005). "The Chromatic Scales of the Deuteros Modes in Theory and Practice". Plainsong and Medieval Music. 14: 1–10. doi:10.1017/S0961137104000075. S2CID 162385479.
- Poliakova, Svetlana (June 2009). "Sin 319 and Voskr 27 and the Triodion Cycle in the Liturgical Praxis in Russia during the Studite Period" (PDF). Lissabon: Universidade Nova de Lisboa.
- Popescu-Judeţ, Eugenia; Şırlı, Adriana Ababi (2000). Sources of 18th-century music : Panayiotes Chalathzoglou and Kyrillos Marmarinos' comparative treatises on secular music. Istanbul: Pan Yayıncılık. ISBN 978-975-843405-3.
- Raasted, Jørgen (1966). Intonation Formulas and Modal Signatures in Byzantine Musical Manuscripts. Monumenta Musicae Byzantinae, Subsidia. Vol. 7. Copenhagen: E. Munksgaard.
- Raasted, Jørgen (1995). Szendrej, Janka; Hiley, David (eds.). Koukouzeles' Revision of the Sticherarion and Sinai gr. 1230. Spolia Berolinensi. Vol. 7. Hildesheim, Zurich: Weidmann. pp. 261–277. ISBN 978-3615001716.
- Raasted, Jørgen; Troelsgård, Christian (2001). "Papadikē". Grove Music Online. doi:10.1093/gmo/9781561592630.article.20844. ISBN 978-1-56159-263-0.
- Strunk, William Oliver (1942). "The Tonal System of Byzantine Music". The Musical Quarterly. 28 (2): 190–204. doi:10.1093/mq/XXVIII.2.190.
- Strunk, William Oliver (1945). "Intonations and Signatures of the Byzantine Modes". The Musical Quarterly. 31 (3): 339–355. doi:10.1093/mq/XXXI.3.339.
- Strunk, William Oliver (1956). "The Byzantine Office at Hagia Sophia". Dumbarton Oaks Papers. 9/10: 175–202. doi:10.2307/1291096. JSTOR 1291096.
- Strunk, William Oliver (1960). "The Latin Antiphons for the Octave of the Epiphany". Journal of the American Musicological Society. 13: 50–67. doi:10.2307/830246. JSTOR 830246.
- Taft, Robert (1977). "The Evolution of the Byzantine 'Divine Liturgy'". Orientalia Christiana Periodica. 43: 8–30.
- Terzopoulos, Konstantinos (2008). "Singing with the Angelic Choir: Anagogy, the Prototype of Orthodox Worship and the Psaltic Art". Psalticnotes. 1.
- Troelsgård, Christian (1997). Christian Troelsgård (ed.). "The Development of a Didactic Poem: Some Remarks on the Ἴσον, ὀλίγον, ὀξεῖα by Ioannes Glykys". Byzantine Chant: Tradition and Reform — Acts of a Meeting Held at the Danish Institute at Athens, 1993. Monographs of the Danish Institute at Athens. 4: 69–85.
- Troelsgård, Christian (2007). "A New Source for the Early Octoechos? Papyrus Vindobonensis G 19.934 and its musical implications". Proceedings of the 1st International Conference of the ASBMH (PDF). pp. 668–679.
- Troelsgård, Christian (2011). Byzantine neumes: A New Introduction to the Middle Byzantine Musical Notation. Monumenta musicae byzantinae, Subsidia. Vol. 9. Copenhagen: Museum Tusculanum Press. ISBN 978-87-635-3158-0.
- Troelsgård, Christian (2001). "Psalm, § III Byzantine Psalmody". Grove Music Online. doi:10.1093/gmo/9781561592630.article.48161.
- Williams, Edvard V.; Troelsgård, Christian (2001). "Akolouthiai". Grove Music Online. doi:10.1093/gmo/9781561592630.article.00384. ISBN 978-1-56159-263-0.
- Williams, Edvard V.; Troelsgård, Christian (2001). "Glykys, Joannes". Grove Music Online. doi:10.1093/gmo/9781561592630.article.11306.
- Wolfram, Gerda (1993). "Erneuernde Tendenzen in der Byzantinischen Kirchenmusik des 13./14. Jahrhunderts". Revista de Musicología. 16 (2): 763–768. doi:10.2307/20795935. JSTOR 20795935.
- Zannos, Ioannis (1994). Vogel, Martin (ed.). Ichos und Makam - Vergleichende Untersuchungen zum Tonsystem der griechisch-orthodoxen Kirchenmusik und der türkischen Kunstmusik. Orpheus-Schriftenreihe zu Grundfragen der Musik. Vol. 74. Bonn: Verlag für systematische Musikwissenschaft. ISBN 9783922626749.
