= Theodorus Lector =

Byzantine lector

Theodorus Lector (Greek: Θεόδωρος Ἀναγνώστης, Theodoros Anagnostes; fl. 6th century AD) was a lector, or reader, at the Hagia Sophia in Constantinople during the early sixth century. (Note: Encyclopædia Britannica dates his tenure from 520-530) He wrote two works of history; one is a collection of sources which relates events beginning in 313, during Constantine's early reign, down to 439, during the reign of Theodosius II. The other is Theodorus' own work, retelling events from the death of Theodosius II in 450 to the beginning of Justin I's reign in 518. The former work is important to scholars editing the authors quoted by Theodorus; the latter exists only in fragment and owes its importance more to the "scantiness of our information concerning the period it treats rather than its merits."

== Historia Tripartita ==
While a lector at Hagia Sophia, Theodorus collected the works of the fifth-century historians Socrates Scholasticus, Sozomen, and Theodoret of Cyrrhus to create a chronicle of church history from Constantine to Theodosius II. The resulting work, Selections from Church History (Τριμερὴς Ἱστορία), known better by its Latin title Historia Tripartita, is a single narrative in four books which gives Theodorus' preferred reading for each section of history related, with notes and comparisons in the margins.

== Historia Ecclesiastica ==
Theodorus later continued his chronicle, using other available sources to write his Church History (Ἐκκλησιαστικὴ Ἱστορία) from the death of Theodosius II down to 518. The date of composition is not known, though it was probably finished before 543, as it can be conjectured that Theodorus would not have spoken of the "holy memory" of Theodoret following the onset of the Three-Chapter Controversy. The chronicle has not survived; excerpts exist in other chronicles, and it is also quoted in a tract by John of Damascus, and by the acts of the Second Council of Nicaea. It is believed that a badly damaged manuscript of this work survives in the Library of St. Mark's in Venice, however no scholarly research has yet been done into it. A critical edition based on all extant excerpts of the Church History was published by Polish scholars in 2020.

A fragment of his Historia, as preserved by Nikephoros Kallistos Xanthopoulos, records the earliest known Byzantine composers, the brothers Anthimos and Timokles.
