= John Laskaris (composer) =

15th century Byzantine composer

John Laskaris (fl. early 15th century) was a Byzantine music theorist and composer.

== Life ==
Laskaris was a native of Constantinople. Although he is often called "John Laskaris of Crete" in the sources, this probably refers to his important period of activity on the island. Besides the common surname Laskaris, he is also known by the surnames Pigonites and Syrpaganos, which is probably a variant of the former with a Latinate prefix meaning "sir". He is also sometimes called John Laskars Kalomisides. All of these surnames point to a Constantinopolitan origin.

Laskaris left his family and property in Constantinople to come to Venetian Crete in 1411. He was already at that time a successful cantor and was probably sent to Crete with the support of the Emperor Manuel II and Patriarch Joseph II to fortify the Church of Crete under Latin rule. The timing of his decision to leave may have been related to the Ottoman siege of 1411. In Crete, he opened a school and taught chanting to boys. Although he was initially permitted by the Venetian authorities to chant wherever he was asked to, in October 1418 he was sued for infringing on the rights of the local clergy, insulting and threatening them. On 26 October, he was sent into exile.

Laskaris was still alive during the reign of John VIII (1425–1448), since he composed a polychronion and a pentekostarion for he and his wife, Maria of Trebizond.

== Works ==
Laskaris composed both church music and lyrics for Greek Orthodox services. Some of his poetry was set to music by others, including John Kladas. His works continued to be copied into the 19th century. He also wrote a theoretical treatise entitled Explanation and Modulation of the Musical Art (or Interpretation and Parallage of the Art of Music). It is preserved in seven manuscripts, often with diagrams.
