= John Kladas =

Byzantine composer

John Kladas (Greek: Ιωάννης Κλαδάς Ioannis Kladas; fl. 1400) was a Byzantine composer. He had the post of lampadarius in the cathedral of Hagia Sophia of Constantinople. He wrote several works on the theory of music, the most important being the Grammatike tes mousikes (The Grammar of Music).

His daughter was a chanter and hymnographer, known only from one composition.

== Sources ==
- Touliatos-Banker, Diane (Spring 1984). "Women Composers of Medieval Byzantine Chant". College Music Symposium. 24 (1): 62–80. JSTOR 40374217.
- Williams, Edward V. (2001). "Kladas [Lampadarios], Joannes". Grove Music Online. Revised by Christian Troelsgård. Oxford: Oxford University Press. doi:10.1093/gmo/9781561592630.article.15917. ISBN 978-1-56159-263-0. (subscription, Wikilibrary access, or UK public library membership required)
