= Xenos Korones =

Byzantine Greek hymnographer (fl. 1325–50)

Xenos Korones or Xeno of Koroni (Greek: Ξένος ο Κορώνης; fl. 1325–50) was a Greek chanter and hymnographer. He was the lead chanter of the Hagia Sophia in the 14th century.

== Biography ==
Xeno was born in the city of Koroni in the Peloponnese. He composed the Christian chants "Dynamis" (Δύναμις), "Holy God" (Άγιος ο Θεός) and "All of creation rejoices in you, O full of grace" (Επί σοι χαίρει Κεχαριτωμένη), all of which are still chanted today in the Greek Orthodox Church, but he composed secular music as well. He contributed in his own way to renaissance music and received considerable recognition for his inspiring compositions. The artist's name first became known in Constantinople when he was proclaimed the chief musician of the palace and around the same time, he was proclaimed the lead chanter of the Hagia Sophia. Xeno's talent was even recognized by the Palaeologans many years later.
