= Irmologion =

Liturgical book of the Byzantine Rite

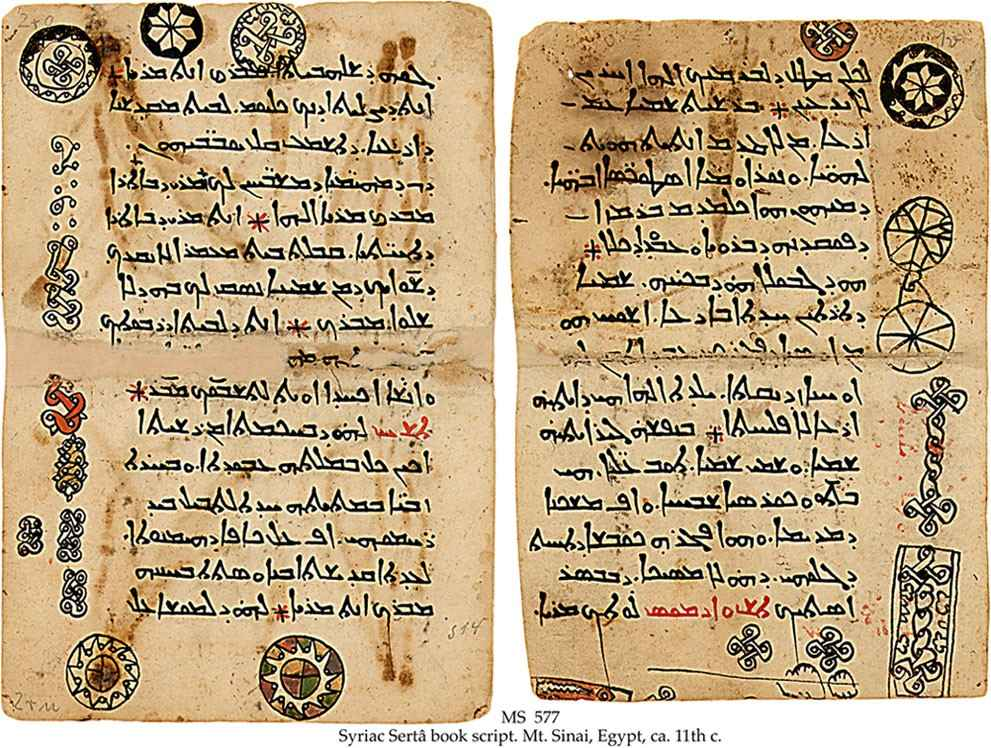
Tropligin, (Melkite Use). Depicted are Irmos 705-709 (Syriac Sertâ book script. 11th century, Saint Catherine's Monastery, Mount Sinai. Now part of the Schøyen Collection, MS 577.

Irmologion (Ancient Greek: τὸ εἱρμολόγιον heirmologion) is a liturgical book of the Eastern Orthodox Church and those Eastern Catholic Churches that follow the Byzantine Rite. It contains irmoi (οἱ εἱρμοί) organised in sequences of odes (αἱ ᾠδαὶ, sg. ἡ ᾠδή) and such a sequence was called canon (ὁ κανών 'law'). These canons of nine, eight, four or three odes are to be chanted during the morning service (Orthros). The name irmologion derives from heirmos (ὁ εἱρμός), which means 'link'. The irmos is a melodic model which preceded the composition of the odes. According to the etymology, the book 'collects' (λογεύω logeuō) the irmoi.

== Musical structure ==
An important portion of Matins and other services in the Orthodox Church is the canon, a long liturgical poem divided into nine strophes with a sophisticated meter called ode. Each ode and its prosodic meter is made according to a certain irmos, and concerning its celebration during Orthros it is followed by troparia called akrosticha. Sometimes certain longer irmoi are sung which are called katabasiai because of their descending melos.

The troparia sung with the canon are performed out of a textbook (Reader, Menaion) according to avtomela, but the irmoi and katabasiae are chanted by the choir according to the model of the irmoi. Since the Irmologion was invented as a chant book provided with musical notation, it only contained the smaller number of heirmoi with those texts which identified them. The other canons and akrosticha were usually collected in a separated text book, and the incipit of a certain heirmos or, in case of troparia the avtomela, indicated the melody which had to be applied for the recitation of the hymns.

Since the Byzantine period, there already developed a soloistic kalophonic way to perform just one certain ode during more important religious feast, if the celebration took more time than usual, but the genre became even more popular and innovative during the Ottoman period following the example of Balasios the Priest. The printed edition of the kalophonic irmologion (1835) is dominated by Ottoman era composers like Chrysaphes the Younger, Germanos of New Patras, Balasios, and later generations like Petros Bereketis and even later the hyphos school founded by Panagiotes Halacoğlu and his followers at the New Music School of the Patriarchate (Daniel the Protopsaltes, Petros Peloponnesios, Georgios of Crete).

== Content layout ==
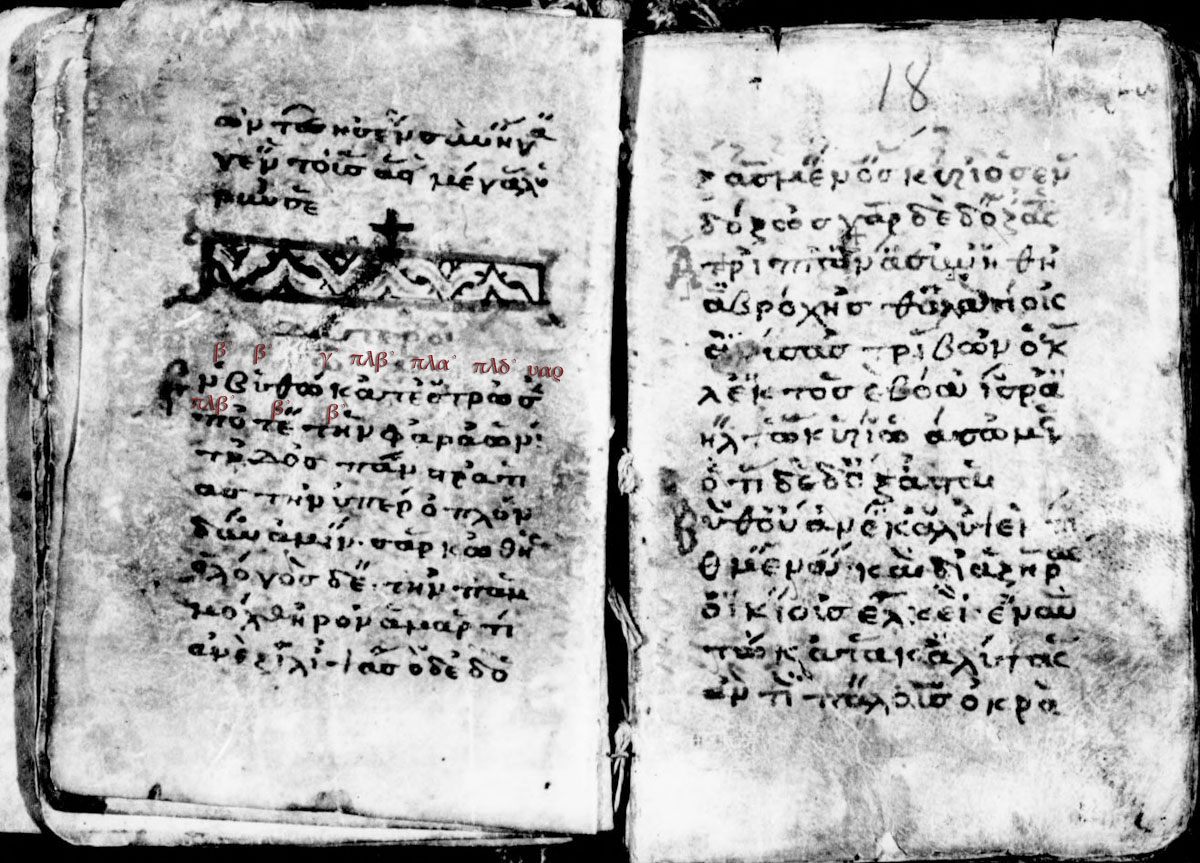
Echos devteros part with first ode settings (OdO) of a Greek Heirmologion with Coislin notation as palimpsest over pages of a former tropologion (ET-MSsc Ms. Gr. 929, ff. 17v-18r)

The earliest sources with heirmoi were the tropologion (Georgian iadgari, Armenian šaraknot') which organised hymns of different genres with modal signatures according to the calendar, beginning with the Christmas and Theophany cycle. The book irmologion developed not earlier than during the 10th century (GR-AOml Ms. β.32 is probably the oldest fully notated irmologion). Within the Irmologion, the new chant book of the Stoudites' reform, the irmoi are usually arranged according to the eight tones of Byzantine chant either according to the odes (order of the odes, OdO, divided into eight parts according to the echoi, but within each echos all odes are ordered beginning with all first odes of each canon, all second or third odes etc.) or according to the canon (canon order, KaO, divided into eight parts according to the echoi, but the odes within each echos are organised according to the canon of each irmos).

As example for the ode order (OdO), one might study the earlier irmologia of the Greek collection at the library of Saint Catherine's Monastery at the foot of Mount Sinai: the manuscripts 929 and 1258 are organised, that the first, second, third, etc. odes are together. Since the second ode is only sung during Lent, there were much less second odes than first or third odes.

As example for the canon order (KaO), one might study the very early fully notated manuscript of the Great Lavra on Mount Athos (GR-AOml Ms. β.32 written about 1000 with Chartres notation), the standard example for Coislin notation (F-Pn Ms. Coislin 220), or the later manuscripts of the Sinai collection (ET-MSsc Sin. gr.) such as Ms. 1256 and the first half of 1257. Here each ode has an ode number, such as ωδ α᾽ for the first ode, usually followed by a modal signature corresponding to the echos section.

The next ode is mostly ωδ γ᾽ for the third ode, because according to the more common canon the second one is left out. Thus, one canon follows the preceding one until the order is fulfilled. These canons usually follow within each echos section according to the calendaric order. There is no real chronology between both orders, both existed already in the oldest heirmologia and they persisted until the current print editions.

It also seems that the earlier manuscripts which still numbered the canons within the canon order, sorted them according to ascribed authors, Ms. Coislin 220 has also more or less concrete descriptions of the festive occasion, and still provides a choice of several canons in different echoi and composed by different authors for the very same feast. The number of canons is higher than in the later heirmologia of the 14th century, and it should be mentioned that certain schools like the one of Germanus I of Constantinople had been completely abandoned in the current print editions of the Orthodox church.

canon order	GR-AOml Ms. β 32		F-Pn Coislin 220
ēchos	canons	folios	canons	folios
πρῶτος	40	1r-34r	25	1r-31r
δεύτερος	43	34r-74r	26	32r-63r
τρίτος	37	74r-107v	23	64r-89v
τέταρτος	47	107v-156v	25	90r-123r
πλάγιος τοῦ πρώτου	41	156v-191v	20	124r-148r
πλάγιος τοῦ δευτέρου	53	192r-240r	23	149r-176r
βαρύς	28	240v-262v	17	177r-197v
πλάγιος τοῦ τετάρτου	54	263r-312v	24	198r-235v

Concerning the Slavonic reception, first by Cyril and Methodius' students around Clement of Ohrid and Constantine of Preslav, the translators did not very close translations of the Greek hymns, they rather tried to preserve the sophisticated system of the melodic models such as avtomela and irmoi without changing the melodies. Within Slavonic manuscripts, the separation between Irmolog and the Oktoich and other books of the sticherarion was less common, usually the Oktoich books were so voluminous, since they included the irmoi (similar to the composition of the older tropologia which persisted until the 12th century), that they were separated into two volumes—one for Glas I-IV (the authentic modes) and a second for Glas V-VIII (the plagal modes). But there are irmologs provided with znamennaya notation since the 12th century—the Irmolog preserved at the Russian State Archive of Ancient Acts (RUS-Mda / ргада fond 381 Ms. 150), for instance. All Old Church Slavonic irmologs are organised in ode order.

Today the Irmologion is often replaced by another chant book which is called "Anthology of the Orthros" (Ἀνθολογία τοῦ Ὄρθρου or Псалтикиина Утренна) which replaced the earlier Akolouthiai used since the 14th century. Some of these Anthologies do also contain the odes of the canon, but also many other hymns of the Psalterion (especially the more elaborated compositions the Polyeleos psalms) and of the book Octoechos which are sung during the morning service (Orthros, Utrenna). Already Codex sinaiticus graecus 1257 dating back to 1332, has a second part dedicated to the recitation of psalm verses (psalmody) during Orthros and Hesperinos, including the Polyeleoi.

These additional hymns sung during Orthros are:

- Antiphons (ἀντίφωνα) which should not be confused with the Latin Antiphon (even if they are often reduced today to a few short troparia which were once sung as a refrain), since it is a rather elaborated form, usually organised in three sections (they usually follow the Great Ectenia at the beginning of the Divine Liturgy and of the Orthros)
- Dogmatica, hymns in honour of the Mother of God (Theotokos) which are also chanted during the Little Entrance of Vespers
- Theotokia, troparia in honour of the Mother of God, but not as specific as the Dogmatica
- Orthros psalm "Theos kyrios" (Богъ Господь) (Ps. 117:27a) three times and Evlogetaria Anastasima in Echos Plagios Protos (Благословенъ еси Господи, Ps. 118:12)
- Troparia of the Resurrection in the eight tones
- The full text of the Polyeleos (Psalms 134 and 135; also Psalm 136, which is used during the Pre-Lenten Season), which is chanted at Matins on Sundays and feast days
- Songs of praise for feasts and saints
- Anabathmoi, or "Hymns of Ascent", based upon Psalms 119–133
- Prokeimena preceding the Gospel
- Doxologiai (Slavoslovie)

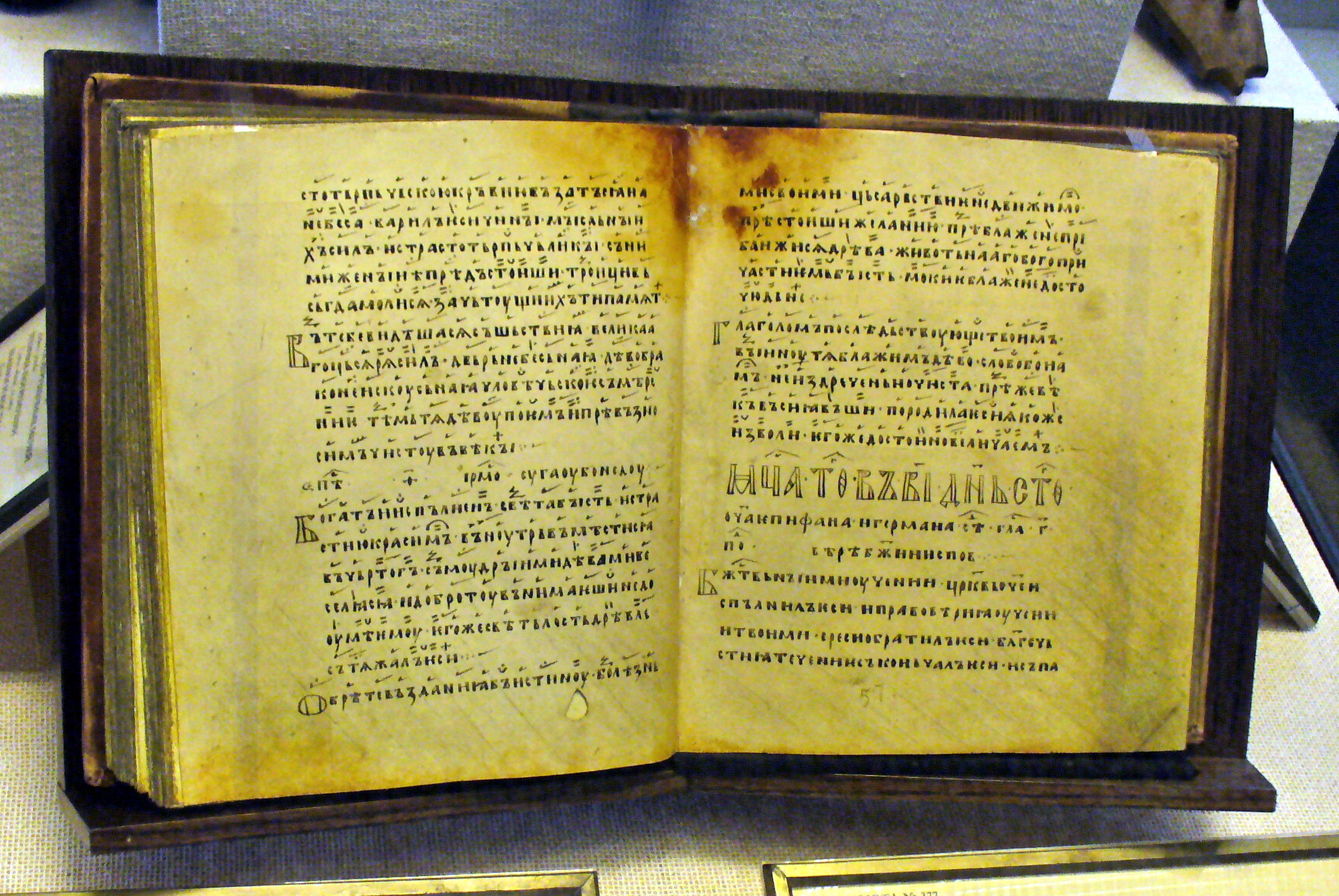
Mineya služebnaya with the page for 12 May, feast of the Holy Fathers Epiphanius and Germanus (RUS-Mim Ms. Sin. 166, f.57r)

== History ==
The oldest manuscripts which contained canons, were tropologia which are composed according to a calendaric order. There were also types like the Georgian Iadgari and the Armenian Šaraknoc'. The book Irmologion was created later as a notated chant book by the reformers at the Stoudios Monastery, although not all Irmologia have musical notation. Concerning the traditional repertoire of these books, a Studites edition can be distinguished from the one at Sinai.

Title page of the Barkalabava irmologion

The earliest notated Irmologion can be dated back to the 10th century in Byzantium. A full version of the Russian Irmologion, in Church Slavonic includes about 1050 irmoi.

An irmologion copied at Kuteino Monastery for the Barkalabava convent in 1651, at the request of its abbess Fotiniya Kirkorovna, is held by the National Historical Museum of Belarus.

Earlier examples provided only the written text; later, the "hooks" and "banners" of Znamenny Chant were added above the text. The first printed edition of a notated Irmologion in Russia, the Irmologiy notnago peniya, using neumes (square notes) on a staff, was published in 1772. Today, most Russian Irmologia are printed using modern musical notation (with the exception of some Old Believer communities, which continue to use the older znamenny neumes), although elsewhere, Byzantine musical notation is nearly universally used.

== See also ==
- Andrew of Crete
- Cosmas of Maiuma
- John of Damascus
- Joseph the Hymnographer
- Octoechos system
- Octoechos and parakletike
- Sticherarion
- Theodore the Studite
- Theophanes the Branded
- Zhyrovichy Irmologion
