= Great Canon =

Christian hymn

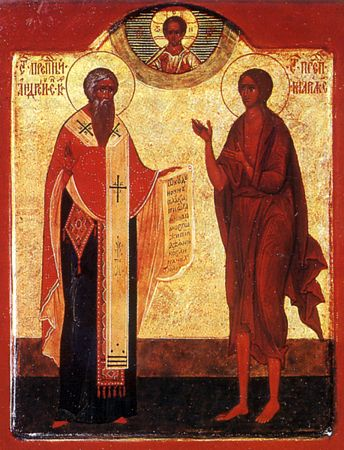
St. Andrew of Crete, author of the Great Canon

The Great Canon also known as the Great Canon of Repentance or the Canon of Repentance is a lengthy and penitential canon composed in the seventh century by St. Andrew of Crete. Sung or chanted multiple times throughout Great Lent, it is highly important to the preparation leading up to Pascha during this time for Byzantine Christians.

== Structure and composition ==
The Great Canon consists of four parts, each divided into nine odes like that of a regular canon. In the Great Canon, there is 250 troparia, which is far greater than compared to other canons. All of the Odes have the same basic format. An irmos, which is generally sung begins each ode. Each irmos has a reference to one of the nine biblical canticles, which are selections from both the Old Testament and New Testament. A variable number of troparia follow, which are short hymns about the subject of the canon. After each troparion the refrain "Have mercy on me, O God, have mercy on me" is chanted. At the end of each Ode, another hymn, called the Katavasia, either the irmos previously sung, or one like it is sung.

== Contents ==
The canon is a dialog between St. Andrew of Crete and his soul. The ongoing theme is an urgent exhortation to change one’s life. St Andrew always mentions his own sinfulness placed in juxtaposition to God’s mercy and uses hundreds of references to good and bad examples from the Old Testament and New Testament to convince himself to repent. Numerous people from the Bible are mentioned in the canon. Canticle One consists of parts of the Book of Genesis. Adam, Eve, Cain, and Able are all mentioned. The rest of the canticles tend to follow the Old Testament in order.

Several themes are present in the canon. These include repentance, recognizing reality, how to pray, examples of righteousness and unrighteousness, and theology of salvation in the Orthodox Church.

== Usage in the Church ==
The Great Canon is only appointed to be read or chanted during Great Lent in Byzantine churches. During the first four nights of Clean Week, it is broken up into parts and read during the service of Great Compline. On Thursday of the Fifth Week, the Great Canon is chanted in its entirety during Orthros. In anticipation of the Canon, Vespers on Wednesday afternoon is longer than normal, with special stichera added in honor of the Great Canon. While the Great Canon itself is recited during Matins for Thursday, this service is usually celebrated by anticipation on the prior Wednesday evening, so that more people can attend.

The faithful generally remain standing during the entirety of the services. At the refrain "Have mercy on me, O God, have mercy on me," a full prostration is performed by those able to do so. Those who are unable do a metania or cross themselves.

As a part of the Matins of the Great Canon, the Life of St. Mary of Egypt by St. Sophronius, Patriarch of Jerusalem (634 - 638) is read, for her example of repentance and overcoming temptation. On this day also is chanted the famous kontakion, "My soul, my soul, why sleepest thou..." by St. Romanos the Melodist. The next day (Thursday morning) a special Presanctified Liturgy is celebrated, and the fast is relaxed slightly (wine and oil are allowed) as consolation after the long service the night before. Some of the odes have additional refrains and troparia to the author of the canon, St. Andrew of Crete, or St. Mary of Egypt, considered one of the greatest models of repentance in Christian history, whose life is read during the chanting of the canon on the fifth Thursday of Great Lent.

== See also ==
- Canon (hymnography)
- St. Andrew of Crete
- St. Mary of Egypt
- Great Lent
- Easter
