= Acolouthia =

Acolouthia (Greek: ἀκολουθία, "a following"; Church Slavonic: последование, romanized: posledovanie) in the Eastern Orthodox and Eastern Catholic churches, signifies the arrangement of the Divine Services (Canonical Hours or Divine Office), perhaps because the parts are closely connected and follow in order. In a more restricted sense, the term "acolouth" refers to the fixed portion of the Office (which does not change daily). The portions of the Office that are variable are called the Sequences. While the structure and history of the various forms of the Divine Office in the numerous ancient Christian rites is exceedingly rich, the following article will restrict itself to the practice as it evolved in the Eastern Roman (Byzantine) Empire.

The Office is composed of both musical and rhetorical elements, the first usually given in the musical mode or tone (echos), according to which the liturgical compositions are chanted. There are eight musical modes: four primary and four secondary (plagal). The rhetorical elements are seldom given in a normal speaking voice, but are "read" in a simple recitative.

As the early chanters rarely used texts set to musical notation, they learned by heart the words and music of some standard hymn, and this served as a model for other hymns of the same rhythm or meter. For example, in a Canon, the strophe or stanza of a standard hymn which indicates the melody of a composition is known as an irmos (eirmos, hirmos). An irmos is placed at the beginning of an Ode to introduce the melody to which it should be chanted, and to tie the theme of the Biblical Canticle on which it is based to the hymns of the Ode that follow (see Canon). A katabasia is the irmos that is sung at the end of an Ode by the choir (which descend from their seats (kathismata) and stand on the floor of the church to sing it). The katabasia winds down the Ode and returns it again to the theme of the Biblical Canticle.

== Cycles ==
The Divine Services are composed of a number of cycles, some large some small, all of which combine to form the services. These cycles are governed by rules prescribed in the Typicon. The basic cycle is the Daily Cycle, which is composed of the Acolouthia (distinct services) into which the Sequences for that day—which are taken from the other cycles—are inserted. The liturgical day begins at sunset, so Vespers is the first service of the day.

== Acolouthia ==
The individual Offices that make up the daily cycle of services are: Vespers, Midnight Office, Orthros (Matins), the four Little Hours, and Apodeipnon (Compline). To this could be added the Typica, which is said on days on which there is no celebration of the Divine Liturgy (Eucharist).

Most of the Offices start with the Usual Beginning (a blessing by the priest, followed by the Trisagion and other prayers, ending with the Lord's Prayer and the call to worship: "O come, let us worship God our King..."), followed by one or several Psalms. The Psalter figures prominently in the Divine Services, and are found both in the fixed and the moveable portions of the services. In the descriptions that follow, the Septuagint numbering of the Psalms will be used.

=== Vespers ===
Vespers is the first office of the day, chanted around the time of sunset, and has three variations: Little Vespers, Great Vespers, and daily Vespers. This is the service that introduces the feast being celebrated that day. Since the day begins at sunset, Vespers for Sunday is celebrate on Saturday evening, etc. At an All-Night Vigil Great Vespers is combined with Matins and First Hour to form one continuous service. In the Greek practice, a Vigil is only performed for one of the Great Feasts of the church year; the Slavs will also perform the Vigil on every Saturday evening.

==== Little Vespers ====
Little Vespers is chanted only before an All-Night Vigil. It is a very abbreviated forma and consist of the Usual Beginning, after which the Reader says Psalm 103 while the priest silently reads the Prayers of Lamplighting (Lychnic). This is followed by the Great Ektenia (Litany). Then the choir chants "Lord, I have cried" (Psalms 140, 141, 129, and 116) with four stichera interposed between the last few verses. Then the Phos Hilaron (a short hymn, praising God at the time of sunset), the prokeimenon, the aposticha, the Nunc dimittis, the trisagion, and the apolytikion.

==== Great Vespers ====
Great Vespers is celebrated on Sundays and feast days, either separately or as part of the All-Night Vigil. It starts with a blessing by the priest and the "Usual Beginning" (unless it is a Vigil, in which case the blessing is different and the Usual Beginning is abbreviated). It is an All-Night Vigil, the priest and deacon perform a full censing of the church. The chanters sing Psalm 103 (either in its entirety or a selection of verses), while the priest comes to stand on the ambon in front of the Holy Doors to recite the "Prayers of Lamp-lighting", after which he goes back inside the sanctuary. Then the deacon comes out onto the ambon and leads the Great Ektenia. Choir chants the first kathisma (a division of the psalter), broken up into three sections, called stases. After each section the deacon leads a Little Ektenia (on Feast Days which do not fall on Sunday only the first stasis and its ektenia is performed). Then the chanters begin "Lord, I Have Cried" with eight stichera (ten on Sundays), while the deacon performs a censing of the entire church. After putting on his phelonion, the priest says the Prayer of the Entrance, and he and the deacon go out the side door of the Iconostasis to make the Little Entrance with the censer. After the prokeimenon (and, on feast days, readings from the Old Testament) the deacon recites the ektenias, and the priest says a prayer while all reverently bow their heads. Then all go in procession to the narthex of the church while the choir chants stichera proper to the feast. There the deacon recites the Litiy (an ektenia, invoking the names of many saints, to which the choir answers Kyrie Eleison many times). Then, if it is a Vigil, the priest blesses loaves of bread, wheat, wine and oil. These will be used for the refreshment and blessing of those attending the vigil. Next the aposticha (stichera proper to the feast) are chanted by the choir followed by the Nunc Dimittis, the trisagion prayers, the Lord's Prayer, the apolytikion (hymn of the Feast), and the dismissal by the Priest.

==== Daily Vespers ====
Vespers, as it is celebrated on ordinary weekdays (i.e., Sunday night through Friday night when there is no occurrence of a Great Feast or major feast day) is very much the same as Great Vespers, but minus some of the more festal aspects. The deacon does not normally serve at daily Vespers, but all of his parts will be done by the priest. After the opening blessing and Psalm 103, the priest recites Great Ektenia. The reader then recites a kathisma (except on Sunday night or any night following an All-Night Vigil). After the Little Ektenia the chanters begin "Lord, I Have Cried" with six or eight stichera, while the priest performs the censing. There is no Little Entrance and there are no readings from Scripture. Rather, after the conclusion of the Theotokion at the end of "Lord I Have Cried", the priest leads the prokeimenon, and the priest says the first of the two litanies, the reader recites the prayer "Vouchsafe, O Lord..." and the priest says the second litany and the prayer at the "Bowing of Heads". Next the Aposticha are chanted by the choir followed by the Nunc Dimittis, the trisagion (a prayer to the Trinity), the Lord's Prayer, the apolytikion (hymn of the day), concluding with the dismissal by the priest.

=== Compline ===
Compline (Greek: Apodeipnon, Slavonic: Povochernia) is the last Office of the waking day, and is served in two different manners: Little Compline and Great Compline.

Great Compline is said during the Lenten seasons and on the eves of certain Great Feasts. Great Compline is much longer than Little Compline and has a much more penitential theme to it, including numerous prostrations.

Little Compline is read any time Great Compline is not called for. It is composed of psalms, a doxology, troparion, the trisagion, the Lord's Prayer, the Kyrie Eleison repeated twelve times, and invitatory versicles, and Psalms 50, 69, and 162, which are followed by the greater doxology, the Creed, the trisagion, the Lord's Prayer, the troparion proper to the feast, the Kyrie Eleison repeated forty times, several invocations, and the long prayers of dismissal.

=== Midnight Office ===
The Midnight Office is normally celebrated only in monasteries, except for the Paschal Vigil when it has a unique structure followed only on that day. Throughout the year, there are three different forms of the Midnight Office: Saturday, Sunday, and Weekday.

=== Matins ===
The first part of Orthros, consists of twelve prayers read by the priest in front of the Holy Doors while the reader reads the Six Psalms, the greater litany, two stichera followed by Psalms 134 and 135, a third sticheron followed by the gradual psalms, an antiphon with the prokeimenon, the reading of the Gospel, many acclamations and the Canon, while the second part of the Orthros, corresponding to Lauds in the Roman Office, is composed of Psalms 148, 149, 150, several similar stichera, the greater doxology, a benediction, and the dismissal.

Each of the Little Hours may followed by a supplementary hour, called an Inter-Hour (Mesorion) during certain seasons of the year. The First Hour (Prime) begins with the recitation of three psalms followed by a doxology, two stichoi, a doxology, a troparion in honour of the Theotokos, the trisagion, several variable troparia, the doxology and dismissal, while its supplementary Hour is composed of a troparion, doxology, Theotokion, Kyrie Eleison repeated forty times, a prayer, and a doxology. The Third Hour (Terce), the Sixth Hour (Sext), and the Ninth Hour (None) and their Inter-Hours each follow the same basic outline as the First Hour.

Before or after the Ninth Hour (depending upon the liturgical season), an office called the Typica is recited. The Typica is only chanted on days when the Divine Liturgy is not celebrated, and consists of many of the psalms and hymns that would have been chanted had the Liturgy been celebrated. Ordinarily this consists of Psalm 102, Psalm 145, and the Beatitudes, followed by prayers and hymns. But in the seasons of fasting this Office is regulated by different rubrics.

== Sequences ==
The Sequences supply for all the Acolouths of the Daily Cycle the material required for a particular Remembrance — that is to say, the material proper to a particular day of the week, a particular date of the year, a particular day in the liturgical seasons (for instance, during Great Lent or the period between Pascha (Easter) and Pentecost). These sequences can be referred to as cycles.

The fundamental element of the Sequence is the troparion, which is a short hymn, or one of the stanzas of a hymn. The kontakion is a troparion which explains briefly the character of the feast celebrated in the day's Office. The oikos is a somewhat longer troparion, which follows after the kontakion and in concise style glorifies the virtues and merits of the subject of the feast which were treated in the kontakion. The apolytikion is a troparion which is proper to the day, and is said just before the dismissal.

The ode was originally one of the nine inspired canticles sung in the morning Office, but later the name was also given to compositions consisting of a varying number of poetical troparia and modelled after the Scriptural odes. Such odes are often combined to form a canon (kanon) which is usually composed of nine, but sometimes of a smaller number of odes. Finally, the stichos is a short verse taken from the Psalms or some other book of Holy Scripture, while the sticheron is a short verse of ecclesiastical composition modelled after the stichos.

== See also ==
- Canonical hours
