= Romanos the Melodist =

6th century Byzantine hymnographer and composer

Saint Romanos
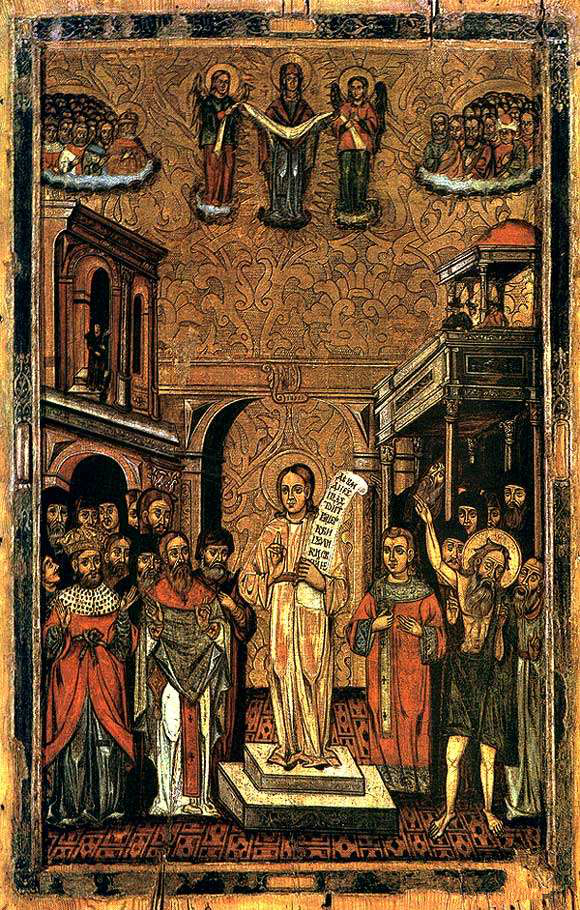
- Icon of Romanus the Melodist (1649)

The Melodist
- Born: Late 5th-century Emesa (modern-day Homs, Syria)
- Died: After 555; Constantinople (modern-day Istanbul, Turkey)
- Venerated in: Eastern Orthodox Church; Catholic Church; Armenian Apostolic Church
- Feast: 1 October (14 October N.S.)
- Attributes: Young man vested as a deacon, standing on a raised platform in the middle of a church, holding a scroll with his Kontakion of the Nativity written on it. He is surrounded by the Patriarch, the Emperor, and members of the congregation. His icon is often a combined with that of The Protection of the Mother of God, which falls on the same day. Sometimes he is depicted as a deacon holding a censer in his right hand and a small model of a church in his left.
- Patronage: Music

Romanos the Melodist (Greek: Ῥωμανὸς ὁ Μελωδός; late 5th-century – after 555) was a Byzantine hymnographer and composer, who is a central early figure in the history of Byzantine music. Called "the Pindar of rhythmic poetry", he flourished during the sixth century, though the earliest manuscripts of his works are dated centuries after this. He was the foremost Kontakion composer of his time.

== Life ==
The main biographical source for Romanos is the Menaion for October. Elsewhere, he is only mentioned by Germanus I of Constantinople in the 8th-century, and in the 10th-century Souda (where he is called "Romanos the melodist"). According to the sources, Romanos was born some time in the late 5th-century, in a site in Syria known as Emesa, to a Jewish family. He was baptized as a young boy (though whether or not his parents also converted is uncertain). He moved to Berytus (Beirut) where he was ordained as a deacon in the Church of the Resurrection. Later, he moved to Constantinople, where he died and was buried in the Church of the Virgin.

== Legend ==
According to legend, Romanus was not at first considered to be either a talented reader or singer. He was, however, loved by the Patriarch of Constantinople because of his great humility. Once, around the year 518, while serving in the Church of the Panagia at Blachernae, during the All-Night Vigil for the Feast of the Nativity of Christ, he was assigned to read the kathisma verses from the Psalter. He read so poorly that another reader had to take his place. Some of the lesser clergy ridiculed Romanus for this, and being humiliated he sat down in one of the choir stalls. Overcome by weariness and sorrow, he soon fell asleep. As he slept, the Theotokos (Mother of God) appeared to him with a scroll in her hand. She commanded him to eat the scroll, and as soon as he did so, he awoke. He immediately received a blessing from the Patriarch, mounted the ambo (pulpit), and chanted extemporaneously his famous Kontakion of the Nativity, "Today the Virgin gives birth to Him Who is above all being…." The emperor, the patriarch, the clergy, and the entire congregation were amazed at both the profound theology of the hymn and Romanos' clear, sonorous voice as he sang. According to tradition, this was the very first kontakion ever sung. The Greek word "kontakion" (κοντάκιον) refers to the shaft on which a scroll is wound, hence the significance of the Theotokos' command for him to swallow a scroll, indicating that his compositions were by divine inspiration. The scene of Romanos's first performance is often shown in the lower register of Pokrov icons (example above).

== Legacy ==
In the Eastern Orthodox Church, Saint Romanos is the patron saint of music; he is celebrated yearly on 1 October.

The Armenian Apostolic Church commemorates Saint Romanos on the Saturday before the third Sunday of the Exaltation of the Cross. This is a remarkable fact given that Saint Romanos lived after the Council of Chalcedon and the Armenian Apostolic Church is non-Chalcedonian. Nevertheless, his music significantly influenced Armenian hymnography.

== Works ==
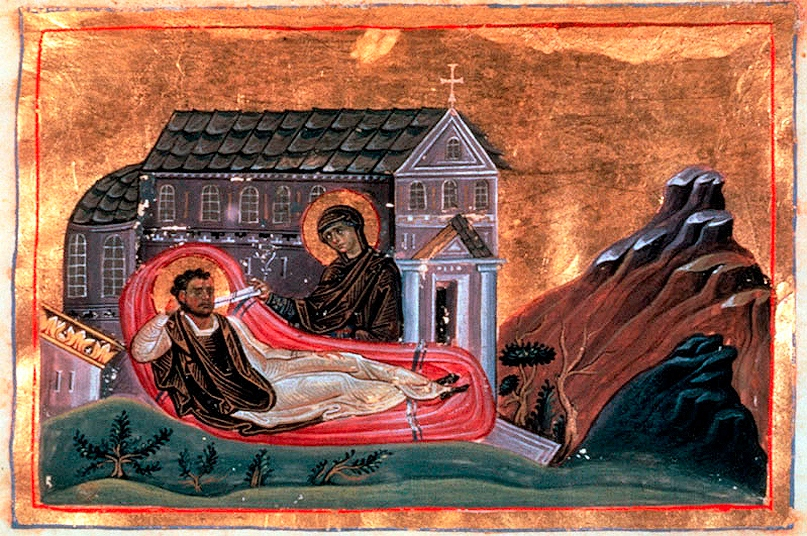
Romanos and Virgin Mary, Miniature from the Menologion of Basil II

=== Number of works ===
According to the hagiographical Synaxarion of Constantinople, Romanos is said to have composed over 1,000 hymns or kontakia. Of the corpus of surviving manuscripts, 89 works are attributed to Romanos, nearly 60 of which are widely accepted as genuine.

=== Style ===
Romanos wrote in an Atticized literary koine—i.e., he had a popular, but elevated style—and abundant Semiticisms support the view that he was of Jewish origin. Arresting imagery, sharp metaphors and similes, bold comparisons, antitheses, coining of successful maxims, and vivid dramatization characterize his style.

=== Kontakion ===
By the ninth-century, the types of works that Romanus composed came to be known as cantica (kontakia, sing. kontakion). Wendy Porter describes the form of these Kontakia:

These are versified sermons set to music, each with a number of metrically identical acrostic stanzas using a common refrain, preceded by a prelude in a different metre. The metre is not classical but relies on accentuation, with its rhythm established through the syllables in each metrical unit.

Today, usually only the first strophe of each kontakion is chanted during the divine services, the full hymn having been replaced by the canon. A full kontakion was a poetic sermon composed of from 18 to 30 verses or ikoi, each with a refrain, and united by an acrostic. When it was sung to an original melody, it was called an idiomelon. Originally, Saint Romanos' works were known simply as "psalms", "odes", or "poems". It was only in the ninth century that the term kontakion came into use.

His Kontakion of the Nativity is still considered to be his masterpiece, and up until the twelfth century it was sung every year at the imperial banquet on that feast by the joint choirs of Hagia Sophia and of the Church of the Holy Apostles in Constantinople. Most of the poem takes the form of a dialogue between the Mother of God and the Magi, whose visit to the newborn Christ Child is celebrated in the Byzantine rite on 25 December, rather than on 6 January when Western Christians celebrate the visit (in the Orthodox Church, January 6, the Feast of the Theophany, celebrates the Baptism of Christ).

Of his other Kontakia, one of the most well-known is the hymn, "My soul, my soul, why sleepest thou..." which is chanted as part of the service of the "Great Canon" of Andrew of Crete on the fifth Thursday of Great Lent.

Romanos is one of many persons who have been credited with composing the famous Akathist Hymn to the Theotokos, which is still sung during Great Lent. Most recent scholarship has asserted that he is not the author of the hymn, although there is significant dissent among scholars.

=== List of notable kontakia ===
- The Nativity of Christ
- The Martyrdom of St Stephen
- The Death of a Monk
- The Last Judgment
- The Prodigal Son
- The Raising of Lazarus (for Lazarus Saturday, the day before Palm Sunday)
- Adam's Lament (for Palm Sunday)
- The Treachery of Judas

=== Manuscripts ===
The earliest complete manuscripts of his works are dated centuries after his lifetime, akin to those of his successors Andrew of Crete and Kassia. The oldest editions of full texts are dated to the 11th century. However, the earliest papyri of any sort date close to when he lived. Two (P.Vindob G 29430 recto and P.Amst. I 24) date to the 6th–7th centuries, and another one (P.Vindob. G 26068 flesh side) dates to the 7th–8th centuries.

Karl Krumbacher published in Munich several previously unpublished chants of Romanos and other hymnographers, from manuscripts discovered in the library of the Monastery of St John the Theologian in Patmos. There exists in the library of Moscow a Greek manuscript which contains kontakia and oikoi for the whole year, but does not include all compositions of Romanos. Krumbacher says of his work:

In poetic talent, fire of inspiration, depth of feeling, and elevation of language, he far surpasses all the other melodes. The literary history of the future will perhaps acclaim Romanos for the greatest ecclesiastical poet of all ages.

== Editions and translations ==
- Songs about Women. Ed. and trans. Thomas Arentzen. Dumbarton Oaks Medieval Library 83. Cambridge, Mass., 2024. (18 kontakia)
- Sancti Romani Melodi Cantica. Vol. 1: Cantica Genuina. – Vol. 2: Cantica Dubia. Ed. by Paul Maas and Constantine A. Trypanis. Oxford, 1963–1970. (complete edition)
- J. B. Pitra, Analecta Sacra, i. (1876), containing 29 poems, and Sanctus Romanus Veterum Melodorum Princeps (1888), with three additional hymns from the Monastery at Patmos. See also Pitra's Hymnographie de l'église grecque (1867)
- Johannes Koder, Romanos Melodos: Die Hymnen. 2 vols. Stuttgart: Hiersemann, 2005-2006, ISBN 3-7772-0500-1 (volume 1) and ISBN 3-7772-0606-7 (volume 2) (German translation of the hymns with introduction and short commentary).
- Karl Krumbacher, Studien zu Romanos (Munich, 1899)
- —Umarbeitungen bei Romanos (Munich, 1899)

== See also ==
- Ephrem the Syrian
- Jacob of Serugh
- Narsai
