= Lectionary 85 =

Lectionary ℓ 85
- New Testament manuscript
- Text: OT and NT lectionary
- Date: 12th/13th-century
- Script: Greek
- Now at: Bibliothèque nationale de France
- Size: 29.8 cm by 22.8 cm

Lectionary 85, designated by siglum ℓ 85 (in the Gregory-Aland numbering), is a Greek manuscript of the New Testament, on parchment leaves. Palaeographically it has been assigned to the 12th or 13th-century.

== Description ==
The codex contains Lessons from the New Testament lectionary (Evangelistarium) with some lacunae. It is written in Greek minuscule letters, on 248 parchment leaves (29.8 cm by 22.8 cm). The writing stands in 2 columns per page, 48-55 lines per page. It contains Menaion, with lessons 7 September – 27 January. Some of leaves are in disorder. It has also lessons from the Old Testament.

== History ==
Scholz examined partially some of its passages. It was examined and described by Paulin Martin. C. R. Gregory saw it in 1885.

The manuscript is not cited in the critical editions of the Greek New Testament (UBS3).

Currently the codex is located in the Bibliothèque nationale de France (Suppl. Gr. 33) in Paris.

== See also ==
- List of New Testament lectionaries
- Biblical manuscript
- Textual criticism
