= Lectionary 95 =

Lectionary ℓ 95
- New Testament manuscript
- Text: Evangelistarion
- Date: 14th-century
- Script: Greek
- Now at: Bibliothèque nationale de France
- Size: 23.4 cm by 17.5 cm

Lectionary 95, designated by siglum ℓ 95 (in the Gregory-Aland numbering), is a Greek manuscript of the New Testament, on parchment leaves. Palaeographically it has been assigned to the 14th-century.

== Description ==
The codex is an Euchologium with lessons from the Gospels John, Matthew, and Luke lectionary (Evangelistarion) with some lacunae. It is written in Greek minuscule letters, on 114 parchment leaves (23.4 cm by 17.5 cm). The writing stands in two columns per page, 31-33 lines per page. Leaf 2 is placed after leaf 8.

== History ==
The manuscript came from Constantinople to Paris. It was added to the list of New Testament manuscripts by Scholz, who examined it partially. It was examined and described by Paulin Martin. C. R. Gregory saw it in 1885.

The manuscript is not cited in the critical editions of the Greek New Testament (UBS3).

Currently the codex is located in the Bibliothèque nationale de France (Gr. 374) in Paris.

== See also ==
- List of New Testament lectionaries
- Biblical manuscript
- Textual criticism
