= Euchologion =

Liturgical works of Eastern Christian Churches

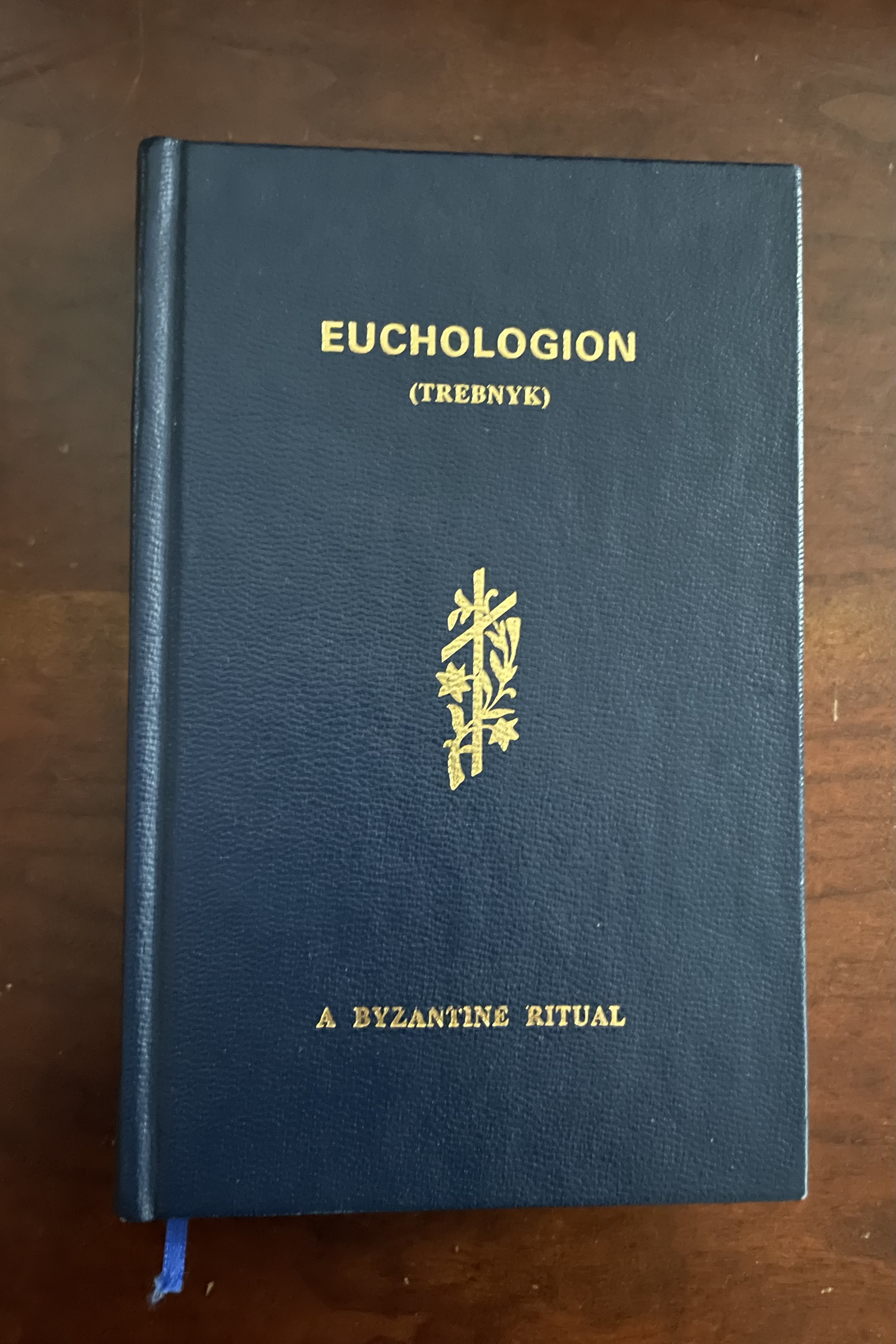
A private-use Euchologion produced by Eastern Catholics

The Euchologion (Greek: Εὐχολόγιον; Church Slavonic: Тре́бникъ, Trébnikъ; Romanian: Euhologiu/Molitfelnic) is one of the chief liturgical books of the Eastern Orthodox and Byzantine Catholic churches, containing the portions of the services which are said by the bishop, priest, or deacon. The Euchologion roughly corresponds to a combination of the missal, ritual, and pontifical as they are used in Latin liturgical rites. There are several different volumes of the book in use.

== Types ==
The comprehensive version is called the Great Euchologion (Greek: Εὐχολόγιον τό μέγα, Euchológion to méga; Slavonic: Больший Иерейский Молитвослов, Bolshiy Iereyskiy Molitvoslov; Romanian: Arhieraticon), and contains the following:

- The parts for the priest and deacon at Vespers, Orthros (Matins), and the Divine Liturgy, together with supplementary material (Prokeimena, Calendar of Saints, etc.)
- The remaining Sacred Mysteries (sacraments), monastic tonsure, Blessing of Waters, etc. The texts for these and the following services are provided in full.
- Services performed by a bishop (ordination, consecration of a church)
- Various blessings and prayers for occasional use (Blessing of a House, Visitation of the Sick, and funerals)
- Services of supplication (Molebens)

For a full description of the contents and order of the Great Euchologion, see #Content.

The other books contain only portions of the Great Euchologion:

- The Priest's Service Book (Greek: Ἱερατικόν, Hieratikon; Slavonic: Служебник, Sluzhébnik; Romanian: Liturghier) containing Vespers, Matins, Compline and Divine Liturgy, plus supplementary material.
- The Small Euchologion or Book of Needs (Greek: Ἁγιασματάριον, Hagiasmatárion; Μικρόν Εὐχολόγιον, Mikron Euchológion; Slavonic: Требниъ, Trébnik; Romanian: Molitfelnic) contains the mysteries (except liturgy) which would be used by a priest, as well as the other services that would be commonly called for in a parish.
- The Pontifical (Greek: Ἀρχιιερατικόν, Archieratikon, Slavonic: Чиновник архиерейского служения, Chinovnik arkhiereyskogo sluzheniya; Romanian: Arhieraticon) contains the portions of Vespers, Matins, liturgy and the mysteries that are performed by a bishop.

== Content ==
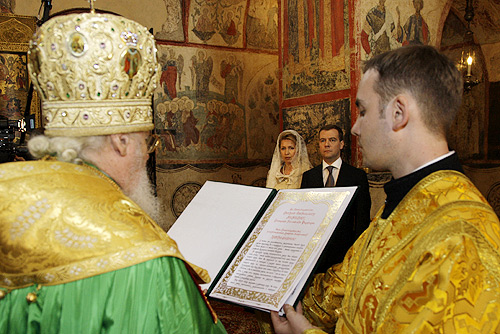
A server holding the Archieratikon for the Russian Orthodox Patriarch of Moscow

The Euchologion contains first, directions for the deacon at the Vespers, Matins, and Divine Liturgy. The priest's prayers and the deacon's litanies for Vespers and Matins follow. Then come the Liturgies (Eucharist): first, rubrics for the Divine Liturgy in general, and a long note about the arrangement of the prosphora (breads) at the Proskomide (Liturgy of Preparation). The Liturgy of St. John Chrysostom is the frame into which the other Liturgies are fitted. The Euchologion contains only the parts of priest and deacon in full length, first for the Liturgy of St. John Chrysostom, then for those parts of Liturgy of St. Basil that differ from it; then the Liturgy of the Presanctified Gifts, beginning with the Hesperinon (Vespers) that always precedes it.

After the Liturgies follow a collection of the Sacred Mysteries (sacraments and sacramentals) with various rules, canons, and blessings. First the rite of churching the mother after child-birth (euchai eis gynaika lecho), adapted for various conditions, then certain "Canons of the Apostles and Fathers" regarding Baptism, prayers to be said over Catechumens, the Rite of Baptism, followed by the ablution (apolousis) of the child, seven days later; Exorcisms of St. Basil and St. John Chrysostom, and the Rite of Consecrating Chrism (myron) on Holy Thursday. Then follow the Ordination services for deacon, priest, and bishop (there is a second rite of ordaining bishops "according to the exposition of the most holy Lord Metrophanes, Metropolitan of Nyssa"), the blessing of a hegumenos (abbot) and of other superiors of monasteries, a prayer for those who begin to serve in the Church, and the rites for minor orders (reader, chanter, and subdeacon).

The ceremonies for tonsuring monks or nuns come next, the appointing of a priest to be confessor (pneumatikos) and the manner of hearing confession, prayers to be said over persons who take a solemn oath, for those who incur canonical punishments, and for those who are absolved from them.

Then comes a collection of prayers for various necessities. A long hymn to Our Lady for "forgiveness of sins", written by a monk, Euthymius, follows, and then the rites of betrothal, marriage (called the "crowning", Stephanoma, from the most striking feature of the ceremony), the prayers for taking off the crowns eight days later, the rite of second marriages (called "digamy", digamia, in which the persons are not crowned), and the very long unction of the sick (to agion elaion), prescribed to be performed by seven priests.

Next, consecrations for new churches and antimensia (the corporal containing relics used for the Divine Liturgy; it is really a kind of portable altar), the ceremony of washing the altar on Holy Thursday, erection of a Stauropegion (a monastery that is exempt from the control of the local bishop, being instead subject directly to the Patriarch or Synod of Bishops), the Lesser Blessing of Waters (hagiasmos), and the Great Blessing of Waters (used on Theophany), followed by a sacramental which consists of bathing (nipter) afterwards.

After one or two more ceremonies, such as a rite of the Kneeling Prayer (gonyklisis) on the evening of Pentecost, exorcisms, prayers for the sick and dying, come the distinct burial services used for laymen, monks, priests, children and any burial occurring during Bright Week. Then follows a miscellaneous collection of prayers and hymns (marked euchai diaphoroi), Canons of penance, against earthquakes, in time of pestilence, and war, and two addressed to the Theotokos. More prayers for various occasions end the book.

In modern Euchologia, however, it is usual to add the "Apostles" (the readings from the Epistles) and Gospels for the Great Feasts (these are taken from the two books that contain the whole collection of liturgical lessons), and lastly the arrangement of the court of the Ecumenical Patriarch, with rubrical directions for their various duties during the Liturgy.

Thus the Euchologion is the handbook for bishops, priests, and deacons. It contains only the short responses of the choir, who have their own choir-books (Horologion for the fixed portions of the services, and the Triodion, Pentecostarion, Octoechos and Menaion for the propers).

== Publication ==
The most ancient document of the Rite of Constantinople (which is similar to the Antiochene Rite) is the Barberini Euchologion (gr.336), a Greek manuscript written around 790 A.D.

The first printed edition was published at Venice in 1526. This was followed by another, also in Venice, in 1638 of the Euchologion used by Jacques Goar for his edition. Another edition was published at Venice in 1862, which forms the basis of the current edition of the Great Euchologion, such as that published by Astir at Athens in 1970. The text in the Venetian edition of 1862 was the basis of the edition published in Bucharest in 1703. The 7th edition, edited by Spiridion Zerbos, was printed in 1898 at the Phoenix press (typographeion ho Phoinix) at Venice, the official Greek Orthodox printing house.

The Orthodox Churches that use other liturgical languages have presses (generally at the capital of the country, Moscow, Bucharest, Jerusalem) for their translations. The Euchologion was first translated into Church Slavonic in the 9th century. The definitive version of the Euchologion used in the Ukrainian Orthodox Church was prepared by Peter Mogila, and published in 1646 (republished in Paris, 1988). This edition contains some 20 rituals that were of local origin and are not performed in other Eastern churches (e.g., services for the uncovering of holy relics and for the blessing of monasteries).

Provost Alexios Maltzew of the Russian Embassy Church at Berlin edited the Euchologion in Old Slavonic and German with notes (Vienna, 1861, reprinted at Berlin, 1892).

A complete Euchologion, in several volumes, was printed in Moscow by the Synodal Press in 1902.

Greek-Catholics use the Propaganda edition and have a compendium (mikron euchologion) containing only the Liturgies, Apostles and Gospels, baptism, marriage, unction, and confession (Rome, 1872). J. Goar, O. P., edited the Euchologion with very complete notes, explanations, and illustrations (Euchologion, sive Rituale Græcorum, 2nd ed., Venice, fol., 1720), which became the standard work of reference for Byzantine Rite Catholics.

== Oriental Orthodox ==
Euchologia are also found among the Coptic, Armenian (Mashtots) and East Syrian Churches, which differ from the Byzantine. The Euchologion of Bishop Serapion, a contemporary of St. Athanasius (c.293 – 373), contains texts from the Alexandrian Rite.

== Bibliography ==
- Johannes Chrysostomus (1950). The Divine Liturgy of our patriarch Johannes Chrysostomus (in Greek). Rome. pp. 81 – via archive.org. (with imprimatur of the Holy See)
- Johannes Chrysostomus. The Divine Liturgy of St Johannes Chrysostomus (in Spanish). p. 30. (in use by the Ruthenian Greek Catholic Church)
