= Theodorus and Theophanes =

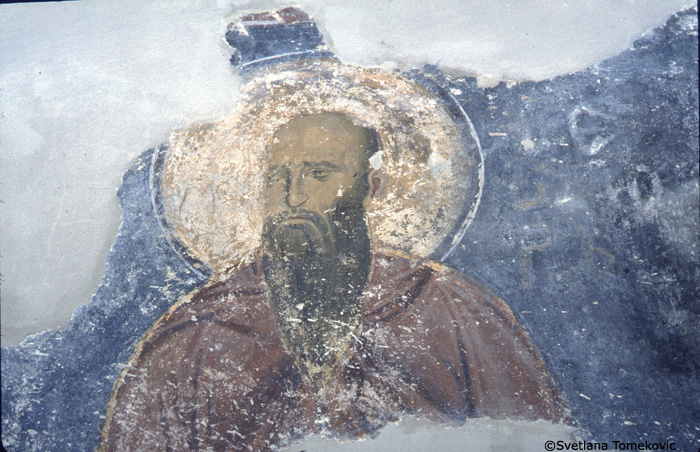
Theodorus's icon

Theodorus (Greek: Θεοδώρος; ca. 775 – ca. 842) and Theophanes (Greek: Θεοφάνης; ca. 778 – 845), called the Grapti (from Greek: γραπτοί, "written upon"), are remembered as proponents of the veneration of icons during the second Iconoclastic controversy. They were brothers and natives of Jerusalem.

== Joint history ==
Theophanes Vita prima was recorded in the Life of Michael the Synkellos. Theophanes and his brother Theodore were born in Palestine near the end of the eighth century, sons of the Venerable Jonah the Presbyter. Both grew up in Jerusalem, entered the Monastery of Mar Sabba near Bethlehem together, and became disciples of Michael the Synkellos (later syncellus of the Patriarch of Jerusalem). In 813 Michael and his two disciples left Jerusalem originally on a journey to Rome. They had been sent by the Patriarch of Jerusalem to support the Pope in his stand against the Franks over the question of the filioque, which some Benedictines from the West had recently introduced to Jerusalem.

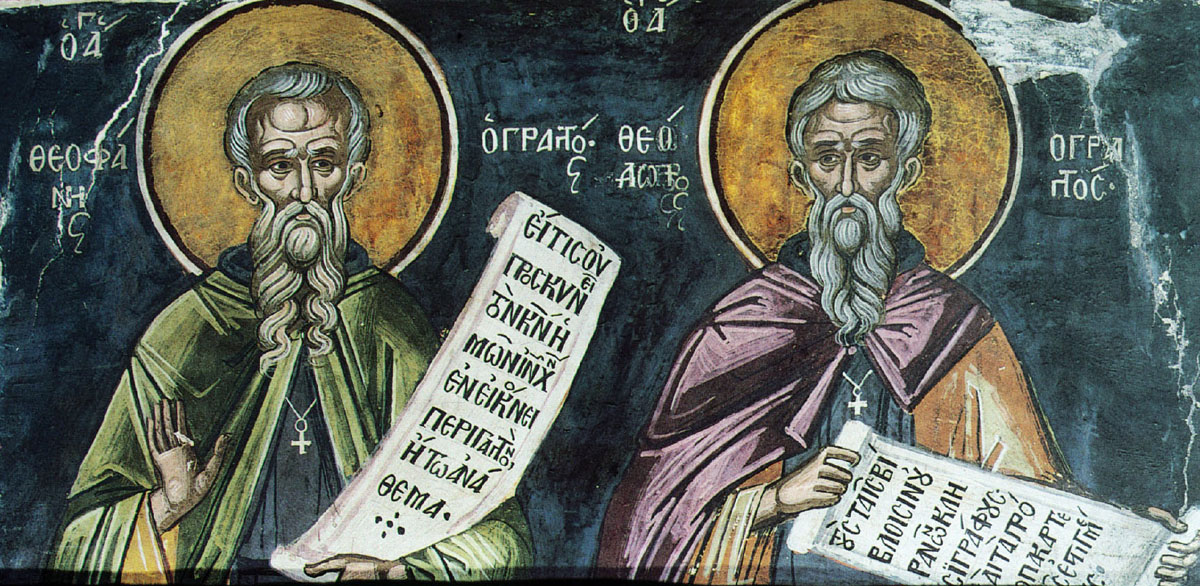
Athonite Fresco of Theophanes and Theodoros

In the course of their journey, in about 812, they landed in Constantinople, entered a monastery, and where in opposition to the Emperor Leo V (813–20) they energetically defended the veneration of images. However, the Seventh Ecumenical Council had condemned Iconoclasm as a heresy, so they were detained, interrogated, beaten and imprisoned by order of the Emperor Leo V (the Armenian) in 815. During the whole of the second iconoclast period—nearly thirty years—they suffered at various times exile, imprisonment and torture.

Under the succeeding emperor, Michael II (820–29), they were brought into the monastery of Sosthenes on the Bosphorus. Michael's successor, the tyrannical and Iconoclastic Theophilos (829–42), exiled them again, but recalled them in 836 to the capital, had them imprisoned in the Praetorium of Constantinople and scourged several times, and had twelve lines of verse cut or tattooed into their skin (hence the nickname "written upon"). Theophilus beat them with his own hand and ordered that they be branded on their faces with twelve lines of ‘badly composed’—the emperor’s own words—if metrically correct, quantitative iambic verses. The ordeal took two days.

They were thrown into prison in the town of Apamea in Bithynia, where Theodore died in prison of his wounds in 841. Michael and Theophanes survived to see Orthodoxy triumph over Iconoclasm in 842 during the reign of the Empress Theodora. Michael was made abbot of the Monastery of Chora, where he died, just two months after Theophanes, in January 846.

The brothers are venerated as saints. In the Eastern Orthodox Church the feast of Theophanes is observed on 11 October, that of Theodorus on 27 December. In the Roman Church the feasts of both are celebrated on 27 December (Cf. Nilles, "Kalendarium manuale utriusque Ecclesiæ", I, 300, 368 sq.).

== Theophanes the Branded ==
Saint Theophanes
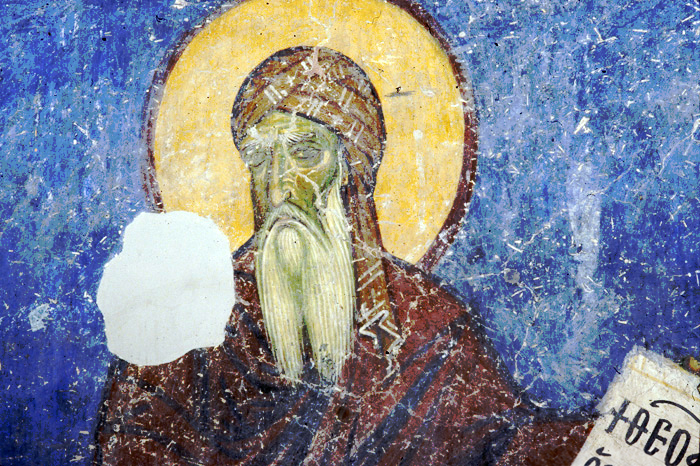

the Branded (Graptus)
- Born: 775; Palestine, Bilad al-Sham, Abbasid Caliphate
- Died: 845; Nicaea, Byzantine Empire (modern İznik, Turkey)
- Venerated in: Catholic Church; Eastern Orthodox Church
- Feast: October 11
- Attributes: Hymnographer

Theophanes the Branded also called Theophanes Graptus or Theophanes of Nicaea (775–845) was a Byzantine monk and hymnographer. Next to Joseph the Hymnographer, Theophanes is the major contributor to the Orthodox liturgical book called the Parakletike. Theophanes was consecrated as Metropolitan of Nicaea by Patriarch Methodius in 842 and administered it until his death in 845.

=== Works ===
Theophanes wrote a large number of religious poems, among them one on his dead brother. (cf. Christ and Paranikas, "Anthologia græca carminum christianorum", Leipzig, 1781).

As a hymnographer, Theophanes belongs to the tradition of the Lavra of Mar Sabbas, which includes many of the greatest writers of canons, including St Andrew of Crete, St Kosmas of Maïouma and St John of Damascus.

His contribution to the Parakletike consists of sets of canons in all Eight Tones for the Angels, and the Departed. He is sometimes said also to have written a set for the Apostles, but those in Tones 7 and 8 are ascribed to Joseph in the Paraklitiki, that in Tone 7 being ‘signed’ acrostically in the Ninth Ode. Not all of these are ‘signed’ in the acrostic, but that for the Angels in Tone 1 has as its acrostic the following, ‘The first hymn of Theophanes for the Angels’, while that for the departed in Tone 5 has, ‘The fifth canon of Theophanes for the dead’. Unfortunately none of these texts has been critically edited and the printed service books often differ widely in their ascriptions.

== (Pseudo)-Theodore the Branded ==
Theodore the Branded also called Theodore Graptus was cited frequently in the 14th century in the polemical works of the Hesychast Controversy, beginning with Nikephoros Gregoras. However, the anti-iconoclast work attributed to Theodore was actually written by Nikephoros of Constantinople. Thus Theodore Graptus's memory, which had nearly died out by the 14th century, received a rehabilitation of sorts through the attribution to him of Nikephoros's work.
