= Katavasia =

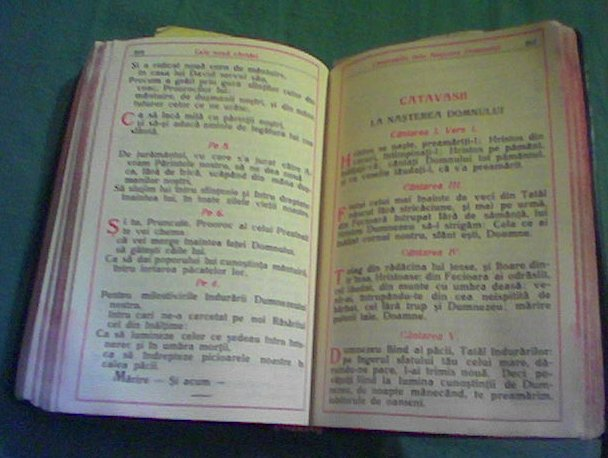
A Romanian Orthodox Horologion opened to the Katabasiae of the Nativity of the Lord.

Katabasia or katavasia (Greek καταβασία, from καταβαίον, "descend") is a type of hymn, and the last troparion of an ode of a canon, chanted in the Eastern Orthodox Church and those Eastern Catholic Churches which follow the Byzantine Rite. Its name is derived from the Greek word katabasia for descent, so called because the cantors used to descend from their kliroses (choir stands) and unite in the middle of the church to sing them.

The katabasia is an irmos that is sung at the end of an ode of the canon. The katabasia is chanted by the choir, who descend from their seats (kathismata) and stand on the floor of the church to sing it, whence its name. Katabasia are chanted at Matins and sometimes during other Divine Services such as Compline. They are also found at other occasional services such as the Mystery of Unction or funerals.

At Matins, on ordinary weekdays, only Odes 3, 6, 8 and 9 have katabasia. On Sundays and higher-ranking feast days, there will be a katabasia at the end of each ode (these are called Festal Katabasia). Most of the other services which use katabasia will have them only after the 3rd, 6th, 8th and 9th odes.

== Ordinary katabasia ==
On ordinary weekdays (that is, days which do not fall on a Sunday or higher-ranking feast day), the irmos from the canon being chanted is repeated at the end as katabasia. When several canons are tied together, as is normally the case at Matins, only the irmos of the first canon is chanted, subsequent irmoi being omitted. The irmos of the final canon in the string will be chanted at the very end of Odes 3, 6, 8 and 9 as katabasia.

== Festal katabasia ==
On Sundays and feast days, Festal Katabasia are used at the end of each ode. These are not necessarily the same as the irmoi of the canon. Which particular Festal Katabasia are used will depend upon the liturgical season. The festal Katabasia are used in anticipation of a Great Feast, and throughout its Afterfeast. During the rest of the year, the Festal Katabasia to the Theotokos (Mother of God) are used.

The following table concerns the chanting of Katabasia on Sundays and Feast Days throughout the year (ordinary weekdays use the Irmos from the last canon chanted on that day) in the Russian Orthodox Church.

From	To	Katabasia
January 1	January 14	Theophany
January 15	Apodosis of the Meeting of the Lord ^{§}	Meeting of the Lord
Day after Apodosis of the Meeting ^{§§}	Cheesefare Saturday	Theotokos or Triodion
Cheesefare Sunday	Bright Saturday	As appointed *
Thomas Sunday	Apodosis of Pascha	Pascha (Easter)
Mid-Pentecost (4th Wednesday of Pascha) °		Mid-Pentecost
Sunday of the Blind Man (6th Sunday of Pascha)	Apodosis of Ascension	Ascension
Ascension Day		Pentecost
Sunday before Pentecost (7th Sunday of Pascha)		Pentecost
Saturday before Pentecost	Apodosis of Pentecost	Pentecost
Sunday of All Saints	July 31	Theotokos
August 1	August 6	Exaltation of the Cross
August 7	August 12	Transfiguration
August 13		Exaltation of the Cross
August 14	August 23	Dormition
August 24	September 21	Exaltation of the Cross
September 22	November 20	Theotokos
November 21	December 31	Nativity of the Lord

^{§} Usually February 9, but if Great Lent begins early, the apodosis may be earlier.
^{§§} Usually February 10, but if Great Lent begins early, the apodosis may be earlier.
* Moveable cycle; the exact dates will differ from year to year, depending upon the date of Easter. During Great Lent the proper Katabasia are found in the Triodion, during the Paschal season they are found in the Pentecostarion.
° Mid-Pentecost falls on the 4th Wednesday of Pascha and lasts for one week, being a "feast within a feast". The Katabasia of Mid-Pentecost are chanted only on the day of the feast and on its Apodosis (the following Wednesday); on the other days of Mid-Pentecost, the Katabasia used are those of Pascha.

== See also ==
- Acolouthia
