= Paraklesis =

Religious service

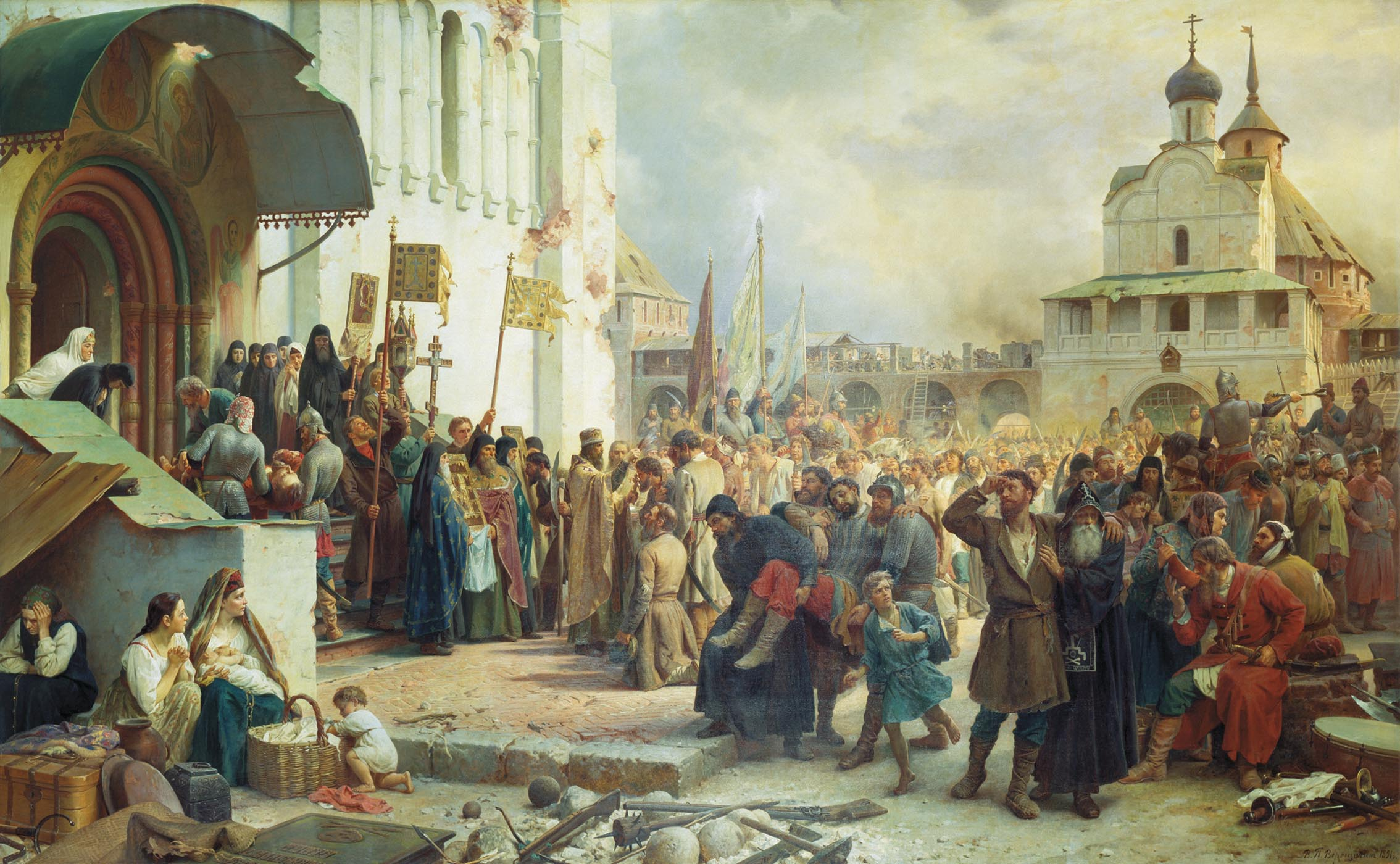
Receiving a blessing at the end of a Molieben at the Trinity-St. Sergius Lavra (Siege of Troise-Sergieva Lavra, by Vasily Petrovich Vereshchagin, 1891).

A Paraklesis (Greek: Παράκλησις, Slavonic: молебенъ) or Supplicatory Canon in the Byzantine Rite, is a service of supplication for the welfare of the living. It is addressed to a specific Saint or to the Most Holy Theotokos whose intercessions are sought through the chanting of the supplicatory canon together with psalms, hymns, and litanies.

The most popular Paraklesis is that in which the supplicatory canon and other hymns are addressed to the Most Holy Theotokos (the Mother of God). There are two forms of this service: the Small Paraklesis (composed by Theosterictus the Monk in the 9th century), and the Great Paraklesis (composed by Emperor Theodore II Laskaris in the 13th century). During the majority of the year, only the Small Paraklesis to the Theotokos is chanted. However, during the Dormition Fast (August 1—14, inclusive), the Typikon prescribes that the Small and Great Paraklesis be chanted on alternate evenings, according to the following regulations:

- If August 1 falls on a Monday through Friday, the cycle begins with the Small Paraklesis. If August 1 falls on a Saturday or Sunday, the cycle begins with the Great Paraklesis.
- On the eves of Sundays (i.e., Saturday nights) and on the eve of the Transfiguration (the night of August 5) the Paraklesis is omitted.
- On Sunday nights, the Great Paraklesis is always used unless it is the eve of Transfiguration.

== Moleben ==
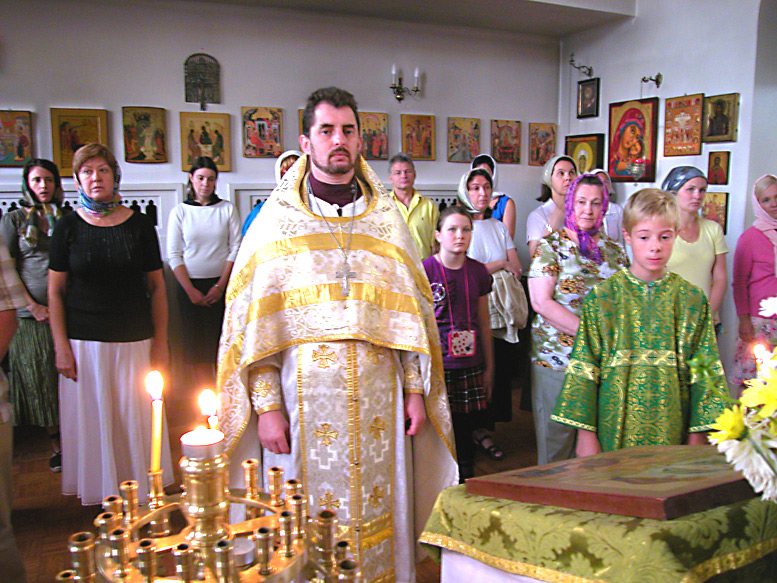
Russian Orthodox priest leading a Moleben on the patronal feast day, Holy Protection Church, Düsseldorf.

In the Russian Orthodox Church, the equivalent of a Paraklesis is the moleben, molében (Slavonic: молебенъ), molieben, service of intercession or service of supplication, which is similar in structure, except that the canon is omitted, retaining only the refrains and Irmoi of the third, sixth and ninth odes. When the full service itself is performed, it is called the "Supplicatory Canon" (Molebnyj Kanon). It is used in honor of Jesus Christ, the Mother of God, a Feast, or a particular saint or martyr.

The present form of the Moleben originated in Slavic culture, but its use is now widespread both in Europe and in the Orthodox and Byzantine Catholic churches that follow the Slavic tradition. Whereas the Paraklesis includes as its principal focus the canon to the subject being honored, the Moleben omits the odes of the canon and includes only the simple refrains that occur between the odes.

Molebens are traditionally served by a priest, but may also be done as a reader's service (i.e., the format used when served by a layperson or deacon; omitting or replacing those portions normally chanted by the priest). It is the custom to celebrate a moleben service only in honor of a glorified saint, and when possible the service is done in front of an icon of the person or feast to whom the Moleben is celebrated. Sometimes an Akathist will be chanted during the celebration of a Moleben.

The general outline of a Moleben is based on the service of Matins, as served on a feast day, complete with a Gospel reading.

Molebens may be occasional (served as needed for illness or travel), commemorative (set for specific days like the New Year or school start), or devotional (honoring a particular saint).

Molebens are very important in the Russian Orthodox tradition, and an entire volume of the Great Euchologion is devoted to them. Most molebens are served in the church, but they may also be served in homes, fields, schools or other appropriate places.

Molebens may also be served in processions. The procession may be going to a particular place, such as during a pilgrimage, or it may circle around the outside of the church building (this is very common on the feast day of the Patron Saint of the church or monastery, and during Bright Week). When a processional Moleben circles around the church, very often the procession will pause on each of the four sides of the building, and the bishop or priest will sprinkle holy water on the church, the icons and people that are taking part in the procession.

== Indulgence ==
The office of the Paraclisis and the hymn Akathistos are recognized within the Eastern Rite Catholic Church.

The Enchiridion Indulgentiarum of 2004 confirmed the plenary indulgence on condition that it is recited piously in a church or oratory (even alone), in a family, religious community, an association of Christ's faithful or, more generally, in a meeting of a plurality of people who come together honestly for this purpose. In other circumstances, partial indulgence is permitted.

== See also ==
- Dormition of the Theotokos
- Akathist
