= Lectionary 94 =

Lectionary ℓ 94
- New Testament manuscript
- Text: Evangelistarion, Apostolos
- Date: 12th-century
- Script: Greek
- Now at: Bibliothèque nationale de France
- Size: 17.9 cm by 13.8 cm

Lectionary 94, designated by siglum ℓ 94 (in the Gregory-Aland numbering), is a Greek manuscript of the New Testament, on parchment leaves. Palaeographically it has been assigned to the 12th-century.

== Description ==
The codex is an Euchologium with lessons from the books of New Testament lectionary (Evangelistarion, Apostolos) with some lacunae. It is written in Greek minuscule letters, on 176 parchment leaves (17.9 cm by 13.8 cm). The writing stands in one column per page, 17–19 lines per page.

It contains fragments of the Liturgy of St. Basil.

== History ==
It was partially examined by Scholz. It was examined and described by Paulin Martin. C. R. Gregory saw it in 1885.

The manuscript is not cited in the critical editions of the Greek New Testament (UBS3).

Currently the codex is located in the Bibliothèque nationale de France (Gr. 330) in Paris.

== See also ==
- List of New Testament lectionaries
- Biblical manuscript
- Textual criticism
