= Apodosis =

Apodosis may refer to:

- Apodosis (linguistics), the main clause in a conditional sentence, expressing the logical consequent
- In the liturgy of the Eastern Orthodox Church, the final day of an Afterfeast
