= Joseph the Hymnographer =

Byzantine Greek poet and hymnwriter (c.816–886)

Saint Joseph
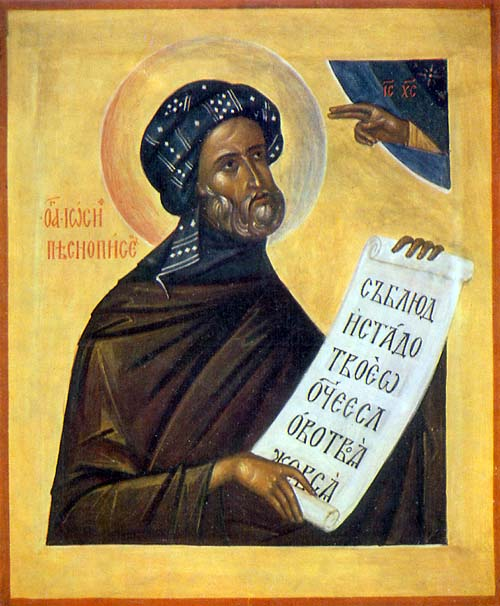

Hymnographer
- Born: c. 816; Sicily
- Died: 3 April 886; Thessaloniki
- Venerated in: Eastern Orthodox Church; Catholic Church
- Feast: Orthodox: April 3/4; Catholic: April 3

Joseph the Hymnographer (Greek: Όσιος Ιωσήφ ο Υμνογράφος, romanized: Ósios Iosif o Ymnográfos; c. 816 – 3 April 886) was a Greek monk of the ninth century. He is regarded as one of the greatest liturgical poets and hymnographers of the Eastern Orthodox Church. He is also known for his confession of the Orthodox Faith in opposition to Iconoclasm.

As a poet he is often confused with Joseph, the Archbishop of Thessalonica and brother of Theodore the Studite, who were one generation older than he was, so that in many cases, attribution of specific hymns to him is uncertain.

== Life ==
He was born around 816 AD in Sicily of devout parents, Plotinus and Agatha. (Note: The exact year of birth is not known, but it can be roughly assumed between 812 and 818, most probably soon after 816.) Joseph's family had to flee from Sicily due to the Arab invasion of the island. (Note: The exact place of origin varied among different hagiographers. He was likely from the Val Demone of Sicily, where most of the Orthodox communities were located. Tomadakes 1971 dates his family's departure from Sicily to 831, from the port of Palermo which he also regards as his birth town. Theodore Pediasimos on the other hand regarded Syracuse as his port and birth town.) According to the hagiographer Theophanes they went to Peloponnese. At the age of fifteen he was tonsured a monk at the Latomos Monastery of Thessalonica. About 840 the bishop of Thessalonica ordained him a hieromonk (priest-monk). While visiting Thessalonica the distinguished Gregory of Dekapolis was so impressed with Joseph, because of his rare character, that he invited him to join his Stoudios Monastery in Constantinople.

=== Iconodule mission to Rome ===
With the resurgence of Byzantine Iconoclasm under Leo V the Armenian and Theophilos, Joseph was sent by Gregory to Rome following an invitation of Pope Leo III in 841. While en route, Joseph was captured by slave-trading pirates and sold as a slave in Crete. In slavery St. Nicholas appeared to Joseph and asked him to sing in the name of God. Nicholas then said to him: "Arise and follow me!" Joseph found freedom soon after his vision. He could finally return to Constantinople after more than one year in slavery in Crete. (Note: Later hagiographic legends, probably influenced by the inventions of Theodore Pediasimos, tent to prolong his stay as a prisoner to six years. The vision of Nicholas of Myra which is directly connected with Theophilos' death, ends with a direct exit from the prison's gates to Constantinople. They also regard the "Saracene" pirates as hired by the iconoclastic emperor. Berbers often acted as slave traders on their own behalf and they were particular interested in educated Greeks due to their high value on Mediterranean slave markets. According to hagiographic conventions, Joseph's adventurous journey to Rome was treated as a via purgativa.) Theophanes is not clear, when Joseph returned to Constantinople, but he mentioned in one paragraph a triumphal return after the death of Theophilos and the restoration of the icons, but also after the recent death of Gregory of Decapolis. (Note: According to Tomadakes' interpretation of Theophanes' Vita Joseph was liberated after 28 January 842, and arrived at Constantinople by February 843, before the feast of Orthodoxy on March 11.(Stiernon 1973, p. 252))

=== Monastic foundations ===
According to the temporal reconstruction of the early vitae by Daniel Stiernon, Joseph founded a monastery dedicated to his deceased mentor, Gregory of Dekapolis, in 855. Joseph started with an enclosure together with his and Gregory's disciple John at St. Antipas. After the latter's death in 850, he spent some years in a kind of sanctuary dedicated to St. John Chrysostom, where he continued his ascetic labors and attracted followers. Joseph transferred the relics taken from Gregory's corpse, together with those from their disciple named John, (Note: The earliest hagiographic sources are not clear to which saint the relics do really belong. Gregory, Bartholomew, and John (in Georgian versions) are mentioned, but they probably do not refer to Joseph's circle, but to Joseph's own hagiographic synaxaries dedicated to Bartholomew the Apostle and John of Egypt.(Stiernon 1973, p. 260)) and placed them in a sanctuary of his monastery's church dedicated to St. Bartholomew the Apostle. (Note: Stiernon 1973, pp. 252f proposed the following datation: the enclosure with his disciple John at the hermitage St. Antipas (843-850), John's death (850), Joseph's stay at a sanctuary (σῆκος) of St. John Chrysostom (850-855), and the foundation of his monastery (855).)

=== Exile and recognition as an anachorete and saint ===
In 858, he was exiled to the theme of Cherson after denouncing Caesar Bardas, brother of the Empress Theodora, for illicit cohabitation. Joseph returned again to Constantinople in 867, after Bardas had been assassinated. (Note: Ev. Tomadakes in Stiernon 1973, p. 253 dates the exile during the first patriarchate of Photius (858-867).)

Through the favour of the Patriarch Ignatius I, he was appointed skeuophylax (keeper of the sacred vessels—i.e., the official responsible for the building containing the treasure of the church) in the Great Church of Constantinople. Joseph also stood high in the favor of Patriarch Photius the Great, the rival and successor of Ignatius, and accompanied Photius into banishment. He was among those who inspired the first missionaries to Russia.

He reportedly possessed the "gift of discernment" because of which Photius appointed him the spiritual father and confessor for priests, recommending him as, "A man of God, an angel in the flesh and father of fathers." He died 3 April 886 AD according to Theophanes.

== Hymnography ==
Since Joseph's contribution to the Studites reform is often confused with the works of Joseph of Thessalonica, Theodore's brother, the exact attribution of poems "by Joseph" is still a controversial issue. Tomadakes (1971) has attributed 385 canons and 9 kontakia of the menaion, 68 canons of the parakletike, 6 complete canons of the triodion and 34 triodes-tetraodes, 2 canons and 24 triodes-tetraodes of the pentekostarion to the Sicilian Joseph. He also created more than 6 canons and 13 stichera—so-called apokrypha which were not included in the new chant books of the sticherarion created by the Studites. This attribution regards Joseph more or less as the author or even inventor of the Parakletike, but earlier sources which had been recently discovered, do not confirm this view, it rather reframes the question, how the repertoire was changed and re-ordered by Joseph's initiative.

== Hagiography and veneration ==
Joseph the Hymnographer appears as well in Latin as in Greek hagiography. (Note: About the hagiographic sources in Anon. 1909, p. 131 and their interpretation, see Stiernon 1973, pp. 245–248) The earliest Vita was written by Theophanes who followed Joseph in his monastery as hegoumenos. There is a later synaxarion, probably of the 11th century, attributed to one John the Deacon whose exact identity is still a controversial matter.

Godfrey Henschen's edition of the synaxarion was reprinted at Patrologia Graeca. A younger Vita was written by Theodore Pediasimos during the early Palaiologan period (early 14th century).

The feast of Joseph the Hymnographer is celebrated on 3 April in the Greek tradition, on 4 April in the Slavic rite, and on 3 April in the 2004 Martyrologium Romanum of the Roman Catholic Church.

== See also ==
- Byzantine music
- Irmologion
- Octoechos and Parakletike
- Sabas of Stoudios
