= Andrew of Crete =

8th-century Christian saint

Saint Andrew of Crete
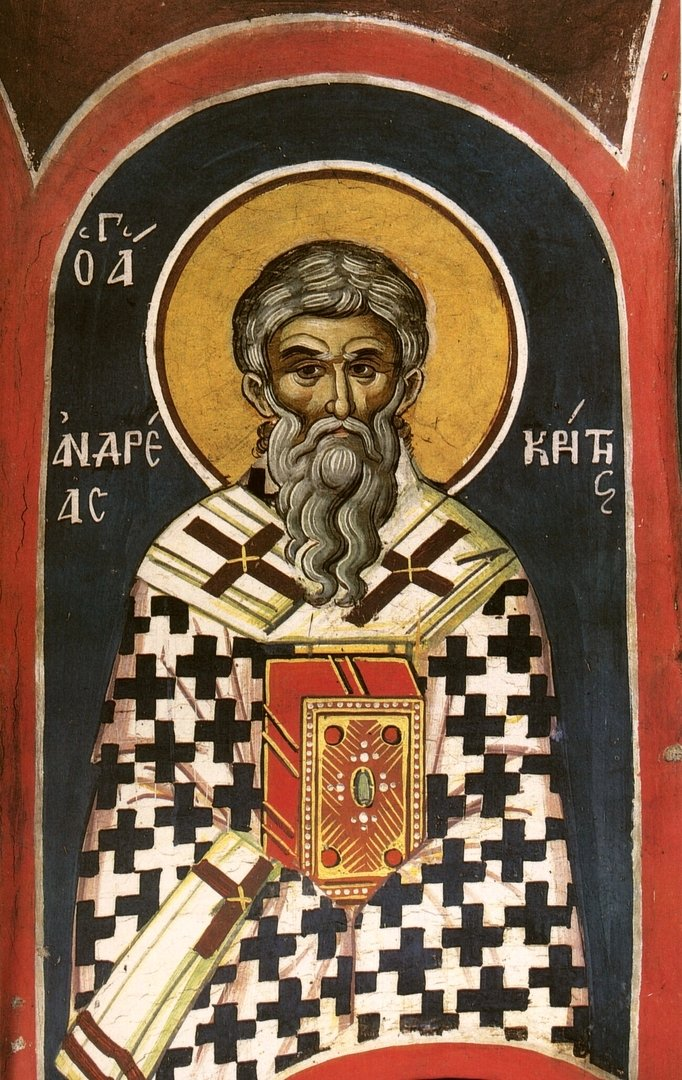
- Fresco of Andrew of Crete. 1547

Archbishop of Crete Venerable Father
- Born: c. 650; Damascus
- Died: July 4, 712 or 726 or 740; Mytilene
- Venerated in: Eastern Orthodox Church; Catholic Church
- Feast: July 4
- Attributes: Vested as a bishop, holding a Gospel Book or scroll, with his right hand raised in blessing. Iconographically, Saint Andrew is depicted with a full head of grey hair and a long, tapering grey beard.

Andrew of Crete (Greek: Ἀνδρέας Κρήτης, c. 650 – July 4, 712 or 726 or 740), also known as Andrew of Jerusalem, was an 8th-century bishop, theologian, homilist, and hymnographer. He is venerated as a saint in both the Eastern Orthodox Church and the Catholic Church.

== Life ==
Born in Damascus (modern-day Syria) c. 650, to Christian parents, Andrew was mute until the age of seven. According to his hagiographers, he was miraculously cured after receiving Holy Communion.

He began his ecclesiastical career at fourteen in the Lavra of Saint Sabbas the Sanctified, near Jerusalem, where he was tonsured.

Theodore, the locum tenens of the Patriarchate of Jerusalem (745–770) made him his Archdeacon, and sent him to the imperial capital of Constantinople as his official representative at the Sixth Ecumenical Council (680–681), which had been called by Emperor Constantine IV to counter the heresy of Monothelitism.

Shortly after the Council, he was summoned back to Constantinople from Jerusalem and appointed Archdeacon at the "Great Church" of Hagia Sophia. In 692 Andrew was appointed to the metropolitan see of Gortyna, in Crete.

Although he had been an opponent of Monothelitism, he nevertheless attended the conciliabulum of 712, in which the decrees of the Ecumenical Council were abolished. In the following year, he repented and returned to orthodoxy and thereafter occupied himself with preaching and writing. As a preacher, his discourses are known for their dignified and harmonious phraseology, for which he is considered to be one of the foremost ecclesiastical orators of the Byzantine Era.

Church historians have no consensus as to the date of his death. What is known is that he died on the island of Lesbos, while returning to Crete from Constantinople, where he had been on church business. His relics were later translated to Constantinople. In 1349, the pious Russian pilgrim Stephen of Novgorod saw his relics at the Monastery of Saint Andrew of Crete in Constantinople. At modern Skala Eresou on Lesbos (ancient Eresos) is a large, Early Christian basilical church in honour of Saint Andrew.

The feast day of Saint Andrew of Crete is July 4 on the Eastern Orthodox liturgical calendar (for those churches which follow the Julian Calendar, July 4 falls on July 17 of the Gregorian Calendar).

== Hymnography ==
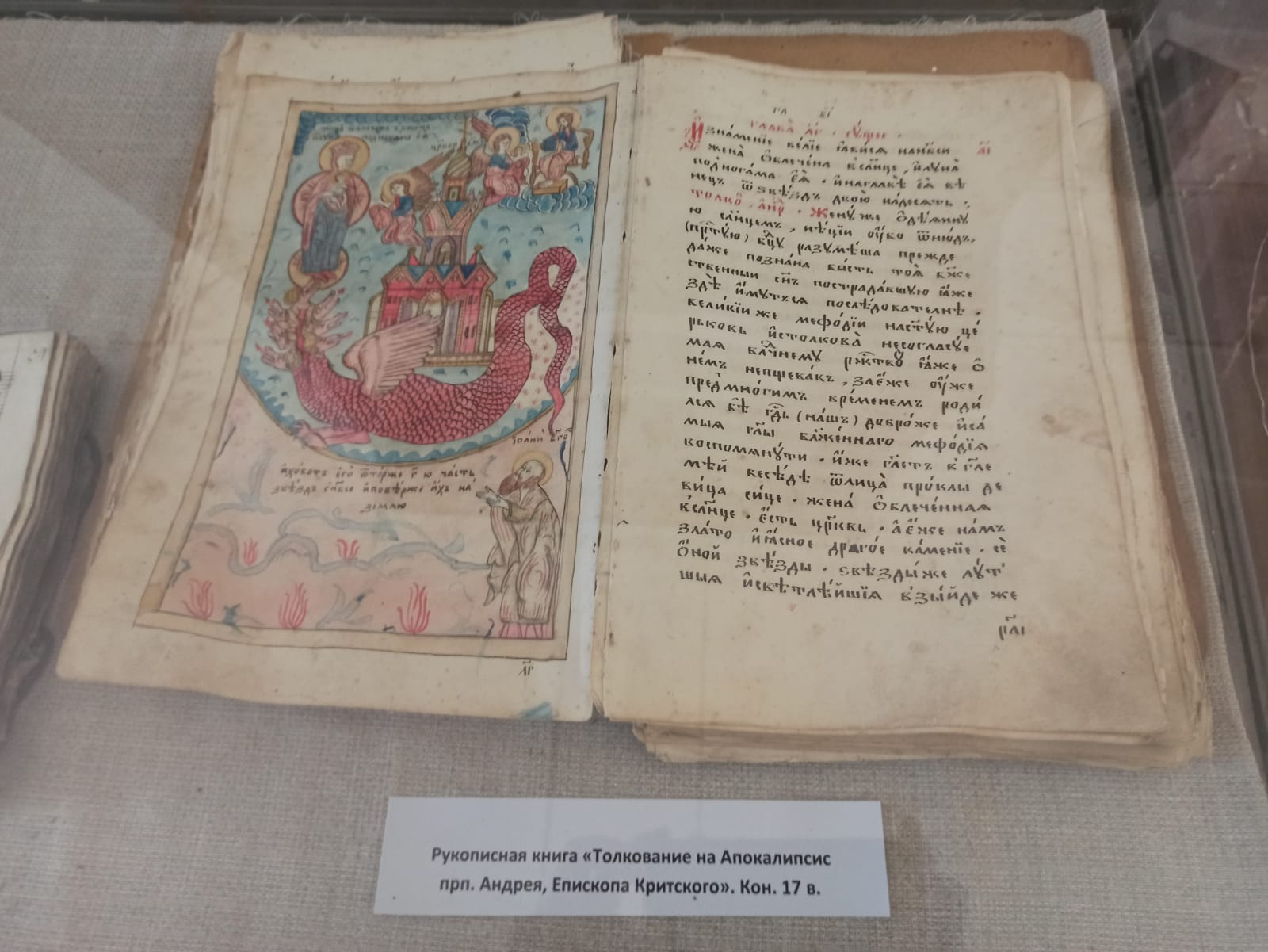
Church of the Epiphany (Nerekhta), museum. Commentaria in Apocalypsin by Andrew of Crete. Manuscript, the end of 17th century

Today, Saint Andrew is primarily known as a hymnographer. He is credited with the invention (or at least the introduction) of the canon, a new form of hymnody, into the liturgy. Previously, the portion of the Matins service which is now the canon was composed of chanting the nine biblical canticles, with short refrains inserted between scriptural verses. Saint Andrew expanded these refrains into fully developed poetic odes, each of which begins with the theme (Irmos) of the scriptural canticle, but then goes on to expound the theme of the feast being celebrated that day (whether the Lord, the Theotokos, a saint, the departed, etc.).

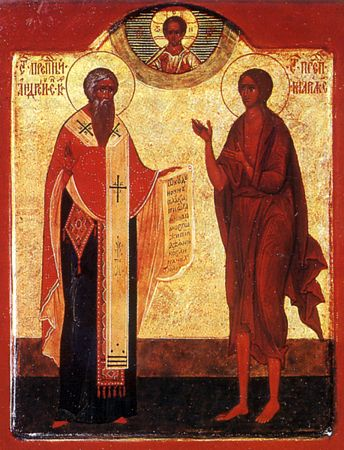
Icon of Andrew of Crete and Mary of Egypt.

His masterpiece, the Great Canon (also known as the Canon of Repentance or the Great Canon of Repentance), is the longest canon ever composed with 250 strophes. It is written primarily in the first person, and goes chronologically through the entire Old and New Testaments drawing examples (both negative and positive) which it correlates to the need of the sinful soul for repentance and a humble return to God. It is divided into four parts (called methymony) which are chanted at Great Compline on the first four nights of Great Lent (one part per night); later, it is chanted in its entirety at Matins on Thursday of the fifth week of Great Lent.

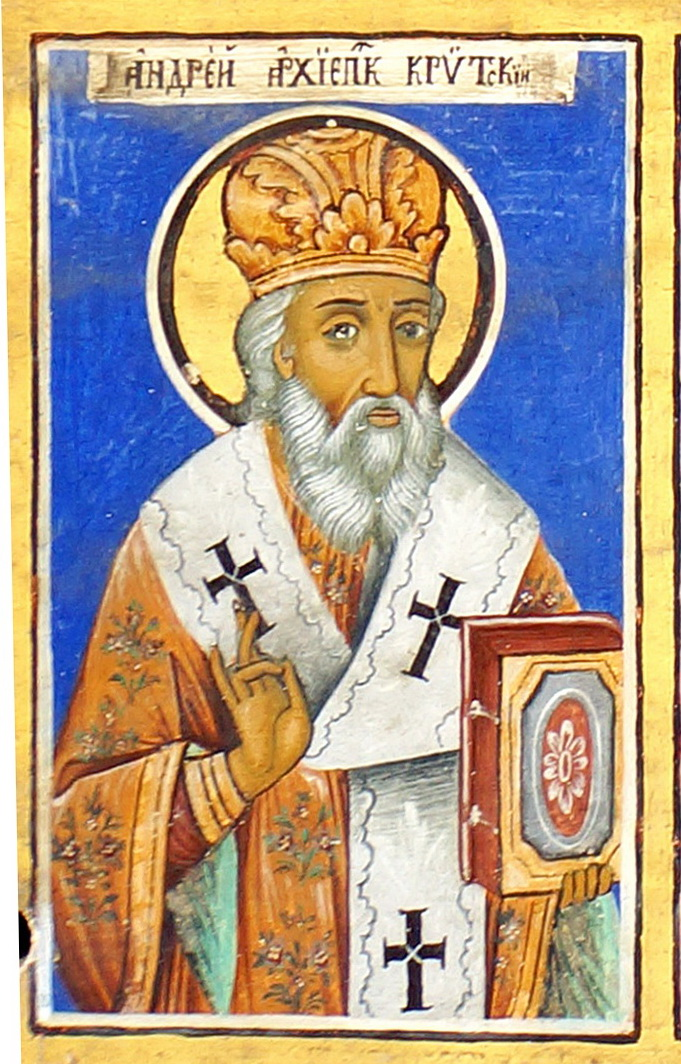
Fresco-icon replica of the miraculous Rila icon. Western narthex. Dimitar Hristov and Zafir. Bulgaria, 1843

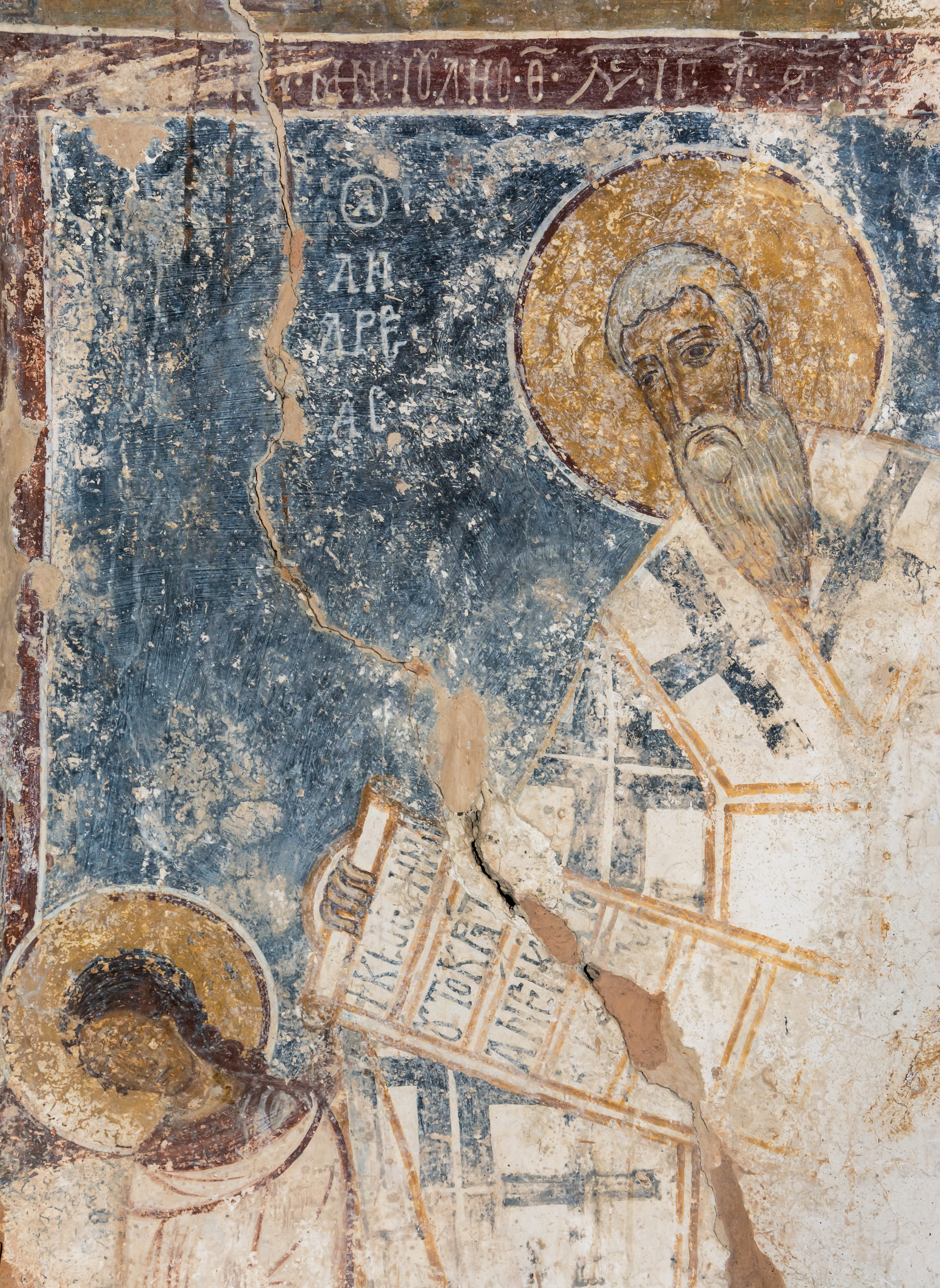
Byzantine fresco in the church of Agia Anna (Αγία Άννα), Amari Valley, Crete. The frescoes are dated 1225 and the oldest dated frescoes in Crete.

Twenty-four canons are reputed to have been written by Saint Andrew of Crete. Of these, we can be more or less certain that he wrote fourteen, including the canons for the Resurrection of Lazarus (chanted at Compline on the Saturday—i.e., Friday night—before Palm Sunday); the Conception of St. Anne (9 December); the Maccabean Martyrs (1 August); St. Ignatius of Antioch (20 December), as well as four Triodia, and no fewer than one hundred and seven irmoi.

== See also ==
- Pseudo-Andrew of Crete
