= Afterfeast =

Period of celebration

An Afterfeast, or Postfeast, is a period of celebration attached to one of the Great Feasts celebrated by the Eastern Orthodox Christian and Eastern Catholic Churches (somewhat analogous to what in Western Christianity would be called an Octave).

The celebration of the Great Feasts of the church year is extended for a number of days, depending upon the particular Feast. Each day of an Afterfeast will have particular hymns assigned to it, continuing the theme of the Feast being celebrated. At each of the divine services during an Afterfeast, the troparion and kontakion of the feast are read or chanted. The canon of the feast will usually be chanted on every day of the Afterfeast (if two canons were chanted on the day of the feast, they will be alternated on the days of the afterfeast).

Most of these Great Feasts also have a day or more of preparation called a Forefeast (most Feasts that are on the moveable Paschal Cycle do not have Forefeasts). Forefeasts and Afterfeasts will affect the structure of the services during the Canonical Hours. Some of the Great Feasts of the Lord have a special canon composed of only three odes, called a Triodion, which is usually chanted at Compline on each day of the Forefeast. (However, the Triodion of the Forefeast of the Transfiguration is said at Matins.)

The last day of an Afterfeast is called the Apodosis (Ancient Greek for "leave-taking", lit. "giving-back") of the Feast. On the Apodosis, most of the hymns that were chanted on the first day of the Feast are repeated. On the Apodosis of Feasts of the Theotokos, the Epistle and Gospel from the day of the Feast are repeated again at the Divine Liturgy. For the Annunciation, the Meeting, and Palm Sunday, the Apodosis may be celebrated for part of a day, at Vespers, the remaining services of the day in question falling outside the festal period. This is indicated in the table below as 1/2 a day.

The Forefeasts and Afterfeasts break down as follows:

Days of Forefeast	Name of Feast	Date	Days of the festal period
1	Nativity of the Theotokos	8 September	5
1	Exaltation of the Cross	14 September	8
1	Entry of the Theotokos	21 November	5
5	Nativity of our Lord	25 December	7
4	Theophany of our Lord	6 January	9
1	Meeting of our Lord	2 February	1 1/2–8
0	Palm Sunday	Sunday before Pascha	1/2
1	Annunciation of the Theotokos	25 March	1 1/2–2
0	Pascha	Sunday of the Resurrection	39
0	Mid-Pentecost	Twenty-fifth day of Pascha	8
1	Ascension of our Lord	Fortieth day of Pascha	9
0	Pentecost (Trinity Sunday)	Fiftieth day of Pascha	7
1	Transfiguration of our Lord	6 August	8
1	Dormition of the Theotokos	15 August	9

Five of these Afterfeasts have a special commemoration on the day following the Feast, called a Synaxis. In this context, a Synaxis commemorates a saint who is intimately bound up with the Feast being celebrated. The four Synaxes are:

- Synaxis of Saints Joachim and Anna (9 September—the day after the Nativity of the Theotokos)
- Synaxis of the Theotokos (26 December—the day after the Nativity of our Lord)
- Synaxis of the Forerunner (7 January—the day after the Theophany of our Lord)
- Synaxis of Saints Simeon the God-Receiver and Anna the Prophetess (3 February—the day after the Meeting of the Lord)
- Synaxis of the Archangel Gabriel (26 March—the day after the Annunciation) If the Annunciation falls during Holy Week the Synaxis is omitted.

Other Great Feasts that have Afterfeasts (although no Forefeasts) are:

- The Nativity of the Forerunner (June 24)
- The Beheading of the Forerunner (August 29)
- The Feast of the Holy Apostles, Saints Peter and Paul (June 29).

Each of these three has only 1 day of Afterfeast, and no Apodosis. These are not counted among the Twelve Great Feasts (i.e., Great Feasts of the Lord or Theotokos).

The Feast of the Procession of the Cross (August 1), though it is not counted as a Great Feast, has one day of Forefeast, and no Afterfeast.
