= Canon (hymnography) =

Structured hymn used in a number of Eastern Orthodox services

A canon (Greek: κανών, romanized: kanōn) is a structured hymn used in a number of Eastern Orthodox services. It consists of nine odes, based on the Biblical canticles. Most of these are found in the Old Testament, but the final ode is taken from the Magnificat and Song of Zechariah from the New Testament. (Note: For clarity, this article will use the term "canticle" to refer to the original biblical text, and "ode" to refer to the composed liturgical hymns.)

The roots of this type of hymn go as far back as the 5th century, reaching maturity in the Greek language through the work of St. Andrew of Crete, whose penitential Great Canon is still used on certain occasions during Great Lent. It was further developed in the 8th century by Sts. John of Damascus and Cosmas of Jerusalem, and in the 9th century by Sts. Joseph the Hymnographer and Theophanes the Branded.

Over time the canon came to replace the kontakion, a vestigial form of which is still used on several occasions and which has been incorporated into the performance of the canon. Each canon develops a specific theme, such as repentance or honouring a particular saint. Sometimes more than one canon can be chanted together, as frequently happens at Matins.

== Biblical canticles and origins ==
The nine biblical canticles are:

1. The Ode of Moses in Exodus (Exodus 15:1–19)
2. The Ode of Moses in Deuteronomy (Deuteronomy 32:1–43) (Note: this is sung only on Tuesdays in Lent)
3. The Prayer of Anna the mother of Samuel the Prophet (1 Samuel 2:1–10)
4. The Prayer of Habakkuk the Prophet (Habakkuk 3:2–19)
5. The Prayer of Isaiah the Prophet (Isaiah 26:9–20)
6. The Prayer of Jonah the Prophet (Jonah 2:3–10)
7. The Prayer of the Three Holy Children (Daniel 3:26-56)*
8. The Song of the Three Holy Children (The Benedicite, Daniel 3:57-88)*
9. The Song of the Theotokos (The Magnificat, Luke 1:46–55) and the Prayer of Zacharias the father of the Forerunner (The Benedictus, Luke 1:68–79)

*These odes are found only in the Septuagint. Verse numberings according to Psalter, which differs from Brenton.

These biblical canticles are normally found in the back of the Psalter used by Orthodox churches, where they are often printed with markings to indicate where to begin inserting the irmos and troparia of the canons. Nowadays, however, the canticles are only sung in large monasteries or, in Russian practice, with the triode on the weekdays of Lent.

20th century scholarship generally agreed that the canon was invented in the late 7th century by Andrew of Crete, a view supported by prominent Byzantine musicologist Egon Wellesz. Via his translation of the Jerusalem Georgian Chantbook, Stephen Shoemaker demonstrates that this form of hymn was already in place by the early 5th century, challenging the prevailing model of Byzantine musical development. Frøyshov independently concurs based on the same evidence; "the Ancient Iadgari proves conclusively that the kanon genre was not invented in the 7th-8th centuries" and "in all probability appeared in the 4th-5th centuries."

== Performance ==
As with all other Orthodox church music, a canon is sung by a choir or cantor in a cappella chant. An ode of the canon is begun by singing the Biblical canticle from its beginning. At some point, this is interrupted by an introductory stanza called an irmos ("link"), which poetically connects the theme of the biblical canticle to the subject of the canon. Following the irmos and sung alternately with the subsequent verses of the Biblical canticle are a series of hymns (troparia), set in the same melody and meter as the irmos, that expand on the theme of the canon. The ode is completed with a final stanza called the katabasia. This might be a repetition of the irmos, the irmos of the last canon when more than one canon is being sung together, the irmos of the canon for an upcoming major feast day, or some other verse prescribed by the service books. (Katabasia means "coming down" and the verse is so called because as originally performed the two choirs would descend from their places on the left and right sides of the church to sing it together in the middle.)

Nearly all canons have only eight odes, the second ode generally being omitted since its canticle is quite penitential and so used only on the triode of the Tuesdays of Great Lent as well as in a few canons of an archaic style such as the aforementioned Great Canon.

Because a canon is composed of nine odes, it can be conveniently divided into three sections. Between Ode III and Ode IV, a sedalen or "sitting hymn" is sung. Between Ode VI and Ode VII, a vestigal kontakion is sung with only its prooimion, or initial stanza, and the first oikos or strophe. If an akathist is to be chanted in conjunction with a canon, it is inserted after Ode VI.

The typical order for a full canon, as currently, in most places, chanted at matins is as follows:

- Ode I
- Ode III
- Little Litany
- Kathisma Hymn
- Ode IV
- Ode V
- Ode VI
- Little Litany
- Kathisma Hymn
- (Synaxarion)
- Ode VII
- Ode VIII
- Magnificat
- Ode IX
- Little Litany
- Exapostilarion

=== Modern arrangement ===
As detailed above, the Biblical canticles are now rarely used, each ode beginning with the irmos, save for the ninth ode where the Magnificat, which forms half of its canticle, is sung in its entirety before the irmos, except on certain major feasts when that ode has a special structure. Following the irmos, each troparion has a brief refrain, determined by the subject matter of the canon, replacing the verse of canticle.

The total number of troparia is determined by local usage. Theoretically, each ode has fourteen (or occasionally sixteen), with some troparia repeated if the service books do not provide enough of them and some conjoined if there are too many. This makes the canon too lengthy for typical parish use, so fewer are sung or in Russian practice, read.

== Usage ==
Canons are used most notably at Matins, but also at the Midnight Office for Sunday; at Great and Small Compline; and at special services such as the Paraklesis and those of similar structure such as the Panichida and Moleben. In Russian practice for the latter cases the canon is often vestigial, consisting of no more than a selection of katabasia with refrains and doxology. The Greek equivalent of a Moleben is the Paraklesis, during which a full canon is still chanted. Canons may also be used in private prayer either as a regular part of a rule or for special needs. One traditional prayerful preparation for reception of the Eucharist is to read three canons and an akathist the evening prior. When used privately there is generally no attempt at an elaborated musical or metrical performance, and may be read silently.

== Abbreviated canons ==
Sometimes abbreviated canons are used. A canon consisting of only four odes is called a tetraode; a canon consisting of only three odes is called a triode. In both of these types of canons, the last two odes are always the VIIIth and IXth. The preceding odes may vary with the day of the week. For instance, during Great Lent, the Lenten Triodion provides triodes at Matins on Monday through Friday: on Mondays they consist of Odes I, VIII and IX, on Tuesdays, Odes II, VIII and IX, and so on through Friday which consists of Odes V, VIII and IX. The Saturdays of Great Lent have tetraodes, consisting of Odes VI, VII, VIII and IX. Because the use of triodes is so prevalent during Great Lent, the book containing the changeable portions of services that liturgical season is called the Triodion. In the Russian Orthodox Church, for arcane historical reasons, the Pentecostarion is called the Flowery Triodion even though it contains no triodes. Triodes and tetraodes are also found during certain Forefeasts and Afterfeasts.

== Poetic and musical structure ==
The Biblical odes are not identical in meter, and so although all the music is performed in the same mode each ode must comprise an individual composition. However, in the original Greek compositions, the irmos and troparia would by design be of the same meter and so could use the same melody. Acrostics would often be present as well, read down a canon's troparia, and sometimes involving the irmos as well if it was composed at the same time. The meter and acrostic would be given along with the canon's title.

This structure is now generally lacking in more recently composed canons, especially when the canons are composed in languages other than Greek to some setting other than Byzantine chant, and since it is now expected that large portions of the canon will be read rather than sung. Although some newer canons also contain acrostics, they are less frequent than they once were.

== Texts ==
The irmoi and katabasia for various occasions are found gathered together in the Irmologion, one of the standard service books of the Orthodox Church.

Complete canons (irmoi with their troparia) are found in the Menaion, Octoechos and Horologion used throughout the year, and in the seasonal service books the Triodion and the Pentecostarion.

Various collections of canons can also be found, as well as publications of individual canons in pamphlet form.

== See also ==
- Kanon Pokajanen

== Bibliography ==
- Brenton, Sir Lancelot C.L. (1986). The Septuagint with Apocrypha: Greek and English (reprint). Hendrickson Publishers. ISBN 0-913573-44-2.
- Conomos, Dimitri (1996). Orthodox Byzantine Music. Retrieved December 31, 2005.
- Archimandrite Ephrem (2005). Canons. Retrieved October 23, 2017.
- Fekula, Peter and Williams, Matthew (1997). The Order of Divine Services according to the usage of the Russian Orthodox Church (2nd ed.). Liberty: Saint John of Kronstadt Press. ISBN 0-912927-90-9.
- Gardner, Johann von (1980). Russian Church Singing, Volume 1. Morosan, Vladimir (tr.). Crestwood: St. Vladimir's Seminary Press. ISBN 0-913836-59-1.
- Rassaphore monk Laurence (1997). The Unabbreviated Horologion (2nd ed. 2nd printing with corrections). Jordanville: Holy Trinity Monastery.
- Mother Mary and Ware, Kallistos (Tr.)(1998). The Festal Menaion (reprint). South Canaan: St. Tikhon's Seminary Press. ISBN 1-878997-00-9.
- Psalter According to the Seventy, The (1987). Boston: Holy Transfiguration Monastery. ISBN 0-943405-00-9.
