= Kathisma =

Divisions of psalms in Eastern Orthodox Church

A kathisma (Greek: κάθισμα; Church Slavonic: каѳисма, romanized: kafisma), literally, 'seat', is a division of the Psalter, used in the Eastern Orthodox and Byzantine Rite Catholic churches. The word may also describe a hymn sung at Matins, a seat used in monastic churches, or a type of monastic establishment.

== Psalms ==
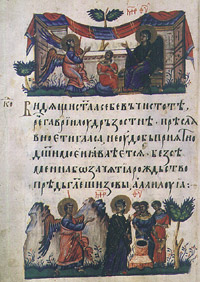
Page from the Tomić Psalter, Bulgarian, 1360.

According to ancient practice, monastics recite all 150 psalms on a regular basis. Originally, the hermits in the desert would recite the entire Psalter every day. With the spread of cenobitic monasticism, the practice began of chanting the Canonical Hours in common, and the Psalter thus became the foundation of the Daily Office, augmented by numerous hymns, prayers and scriptural readings. The custom grew of reciting all 150 psalms each week during the course of the services.

To facilitate this, the 150 psalms were divided into 20 sections, called kathismata (Greek: καθίσματα; Church Slavonic: Каѳи́змы, romanized: Kafizmy, meaning literally, "sittings"). Each kathisma is further subdivided into three staseis (Greek: στάσεις), literally, "standings". As indicated by the latter etymology, the ancient practice was to stand while singing the psalms (which was done by all the monks). The word "kathisma" used to refer to the series of hymns sung after a section of the psalter had been read, during the office of Matins and the original name for these 20 sections was "stichologia". Because the section of the psalter and the hymns sung afterwards are so closely connected, the name for the latter eventually came to be used for the former.

Today, the psalms are read, only the reader stands and other people in attendance sit, until the reader says "Glory to the Father, and to the Son, and to the Holy Spirit..." at which all stand in honor of the Holy Trinity. This is called a doxology, and is repeated after each stasis, followed by the threefold "Alleluia, alleluia, alleluia, glory to Thee, o God!". The following stasis is introduced by a triple "Kyrie eleison" and a doxology. These may be sung or read, depending on the season.

The Orthodox Church uses as its official version of the Old Testament, the ancient Septuagint (Greek) as opposed to the more recent Masoretic (Hebrew) recension. For this reason, the numbering of the psalms follows the Greek rather than the Hebrew (the King James Version of the Bible follows the Hebrew numbering). The difference in numbering can be determined from the following table:

Septuagint (Greek)	Masoretic (Hebrew)
1-8	1-8
9	9-10
10-112	Add 1 to the number of each psalm
113	114-115
114	116:1-9
115	116:10-19
116-145	Add 1 to the number of each psalm
146	147:1-11
147	147:12-20
148-150	148-150

The divisions of the psalms into kathismata is as follows (using the Septuagint numbering):

Kathisma	Stasis 1	Stasis 2	Stasis 3
I	1-3	4-6	7-8
II	9-10	11-13	14-16
III	17	18-20	21-23
IV	24-26	27-29	30-31
V	32-33	34-35	36
VI	37-39	40-42	43-45
VII	46-48	49-50	51-54
VIII	55-57	58-60	61-63
IX	64-66	67	68-69
X	70-71	72-73	74-76
XI	77	78-80	81-84
XII	85-87	88	89-90
XIII	91-93	94-96	97-100
XIV	101-102	103	104
XV	105	106	107-108
XVI	109-111	112-114	115-117
XVII	118:1-72	118:73-131	118:132-176
XVIII	119-123	124-128	129-133
XIX	134-136	137-139	140-142
XX	143-144	145-147	148-150

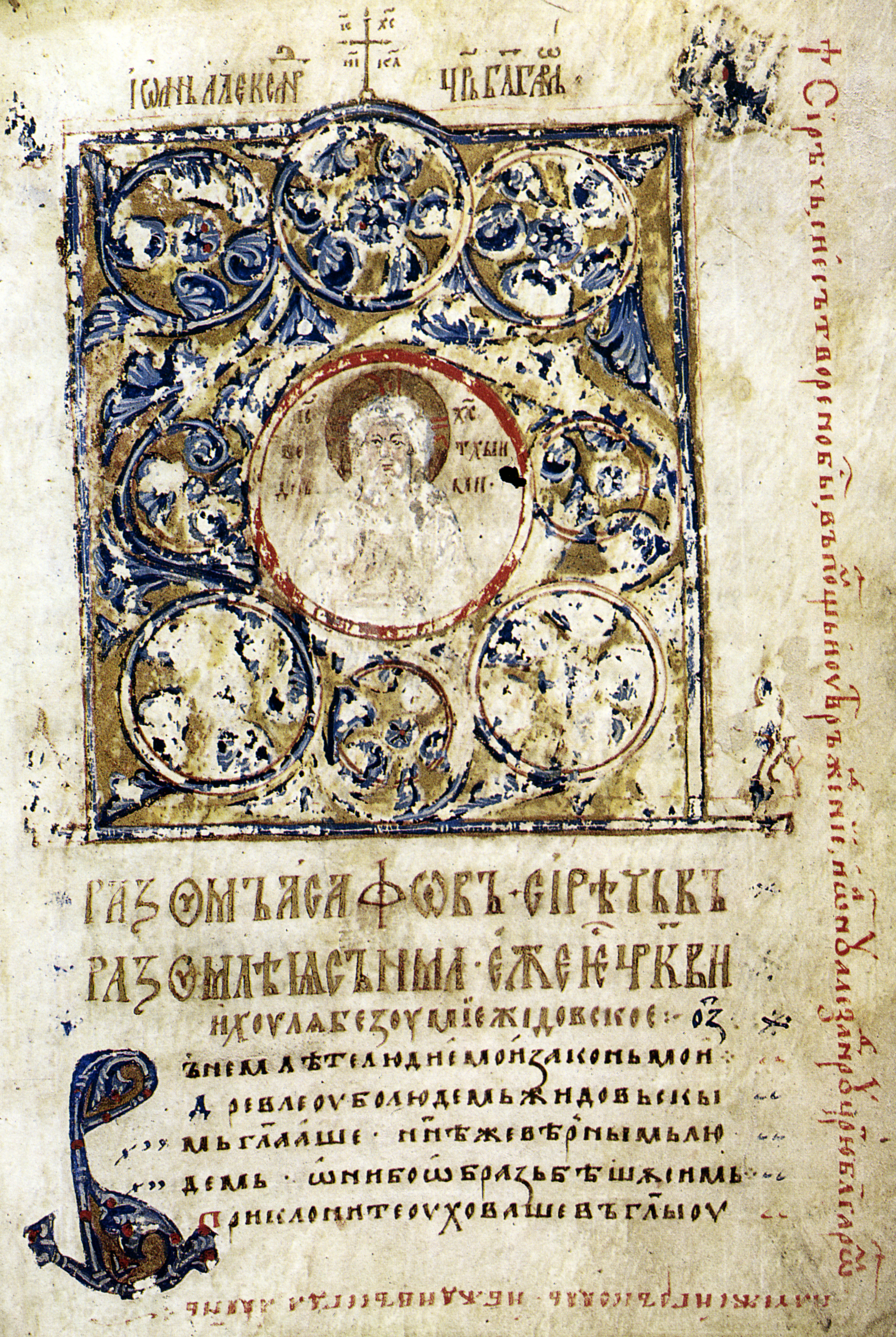
Sofia Psalter, 1337.

The kathismata are divided up between Vespers and Matins, so that all 150 psalms are read during the course of the week. Normally there is one kathisma at Vespers and either two or three at Matins, depending on the day of the week and the time of the year, according to the Church's liturgical calendar. On Sunday nights and the nights following an All-Night Vigil, there will be no kathisma at Vespers. During Great Lent, kathismata are read during the Little Hours also, so that the entire Psalter is completed twice in a week.

Besides the 150 Psalms, the Psalter also contains the nine biblical Canticles which are chanted at matins alongside the canon which evolved from them.

Kathisma XVII, which is composed entirely of Psalm 118, "The Psalm of the Law," is an important component of Matins on Saturdays, some Sundays, Monday-Friday Midnight office, and at the funeral service. The entire Book of Psalms is traditionally read aloud or chanted at the side of the deceased during the whole time from death until the funeral, mirroring Jewish tradition, and is a major element of the wake. When the Psalms are read at a wake, there are special hymns and litanies for the departed that are chanted between each kathisma, often printed at the end of the Psalter.

Some monasteries have a tradition of a "Cell Rule" whereby each monastic will pray several kathismata a day in addition to the ones that are said publicly during the services. Some Psalters have special hymns and prayers printed between the kathismata to be read as devotions when reciting the Cell Rule. In the 20th century, some lay Christians have adopted a continuous reading of the psalms on weekdays, praying the whole book in four weeks, three times a day, one kathisma a day.

In the East Syriac Rite, the Psalter is divided into similar sections called hulali.

== Hymns ==
The word kathisma initially referred to a set of troparia (hymns) chanted after each kathisma from the Psalter at Matins, which was when monks would sit down after singing the psalms. Today they tend to be sung while standing, and may be preceded by a little ektenia (litany), depending on the typikon in use and a number of aspects of the day's propers. In Slavonic it is called a sedálen from sediti, "to sit" (Cf. Latin sedere, "to sit"). For the sake of clarity, many translations into English use the term Sessional Hymns or Sedalen to indicate these hymns as distinct from the kathisma of psalms they follow. Hymns with the same name are also used after the third ode of the canon.

== Seating ==
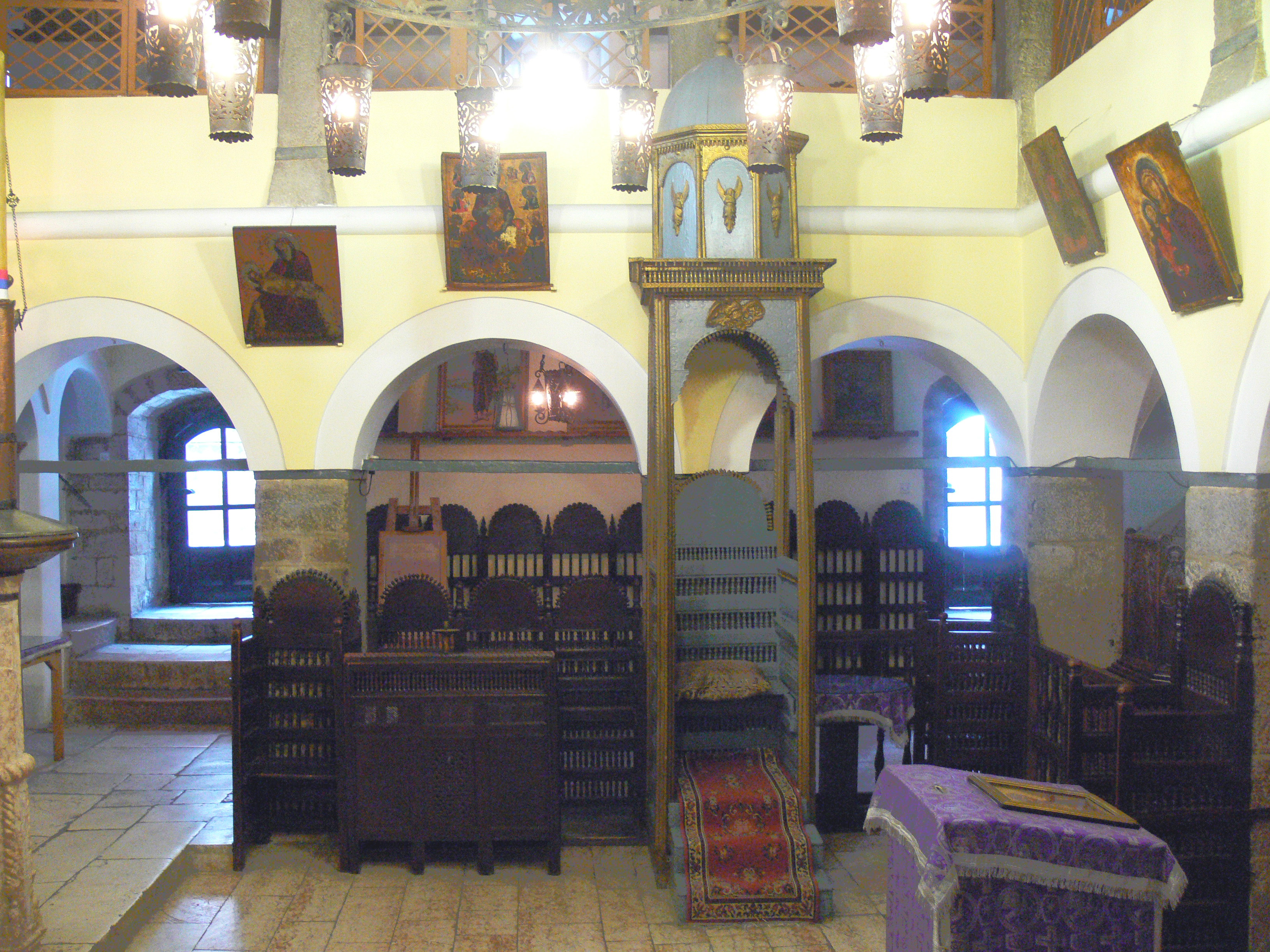
Wooden kathismata at the old Orthodox church in Sarajevo. The taller kathisma with gilded baldachin is for the bishop.

The third meaning of kathisma is its original sense: a seat, stall or box in the sense of a theatre box. (It is related to the word 'cathedral', meaning where a bishop sits, and the phrase 'ex cathedra', which literally means 'from the chair'.) The term was used for the Imperial box at the Hippodrome of Constantinople. In this sense, kathismata (also called stasidia) are the choir stalls used in Orthodox monasteries. Instead of being a long bench, like a pew, the kathismata are a row of individual seats with full backs attached to the walls. The seats are hinged and lift up so the monk or nun can stand upright for the services. The backs are shaped at the top to form arm rests that the monastic can use when he is standing. Often the hinged seat will have a misericord (small wooden seat) on the underside on which he can lean while standing during the long services. Monasteries will often have strict rules as to when the monastics may sit and when they must stand during the services. There will be two rows of kathismata, one on the right kliros (choir), and one on the left.

The bishop has a special kathisma which is more ornate than the ordinary monk's. It is normally located on the right kliros (choir), at the westernmost end, and is often elevated above the others and may have a canopy above it (see cathedra).

== Monastic cell ==
At Mount Athos, each monastic establishment, large or small, belongs to one of twenty "Sovereign Monasteries." The smallest type of these monastic establishments is called a kathisma: it is a simple abode for one solitary monk.
