= Irmos =

Eastern Orthodox liturgical music

The irmos (or heirmos from Koinē Greek: εἱρμός) in the Byzantine liturgical tradition is the initial troparion of an ode of a canon. The meter and melody of an irmos is followed by the remaining troparia of the ode; when more than one canon is used (as is typical at matins), only the first canon's irmos is sung, but the irmoi of the subsequent canons must be known in order to determine an ode's melody and so, even in canons where it is known that the irmos is never sung, the irmos is nonetheless specified. Note that in the Russian tradition, often only the irmos is sung, the rest of the ode simply being read; in Greek parishes, often the remaining troparia are simply eliminated, but in non-Russian traditions, all troparia of a canon are sung

The term comes from the Greek verb "to tie, link" meaning that it poetically connects the Biblical ode to the subject of the canon.

Because the irmos presents a rhythmic and melodic pattern for the troparia which follow, "irmos" gives its name to the irmologic forms of Byzantine chant.

At the end of an ode, the irmos may be repeated, or another irmos may be prescribed to be sung to return to the original biblical theme. This is called the katavasia.

== See also ==
- Irmologion
