= Triodion =

Liturgical book in Eastern Orthodoxy and Byzantine Rite Catholicism

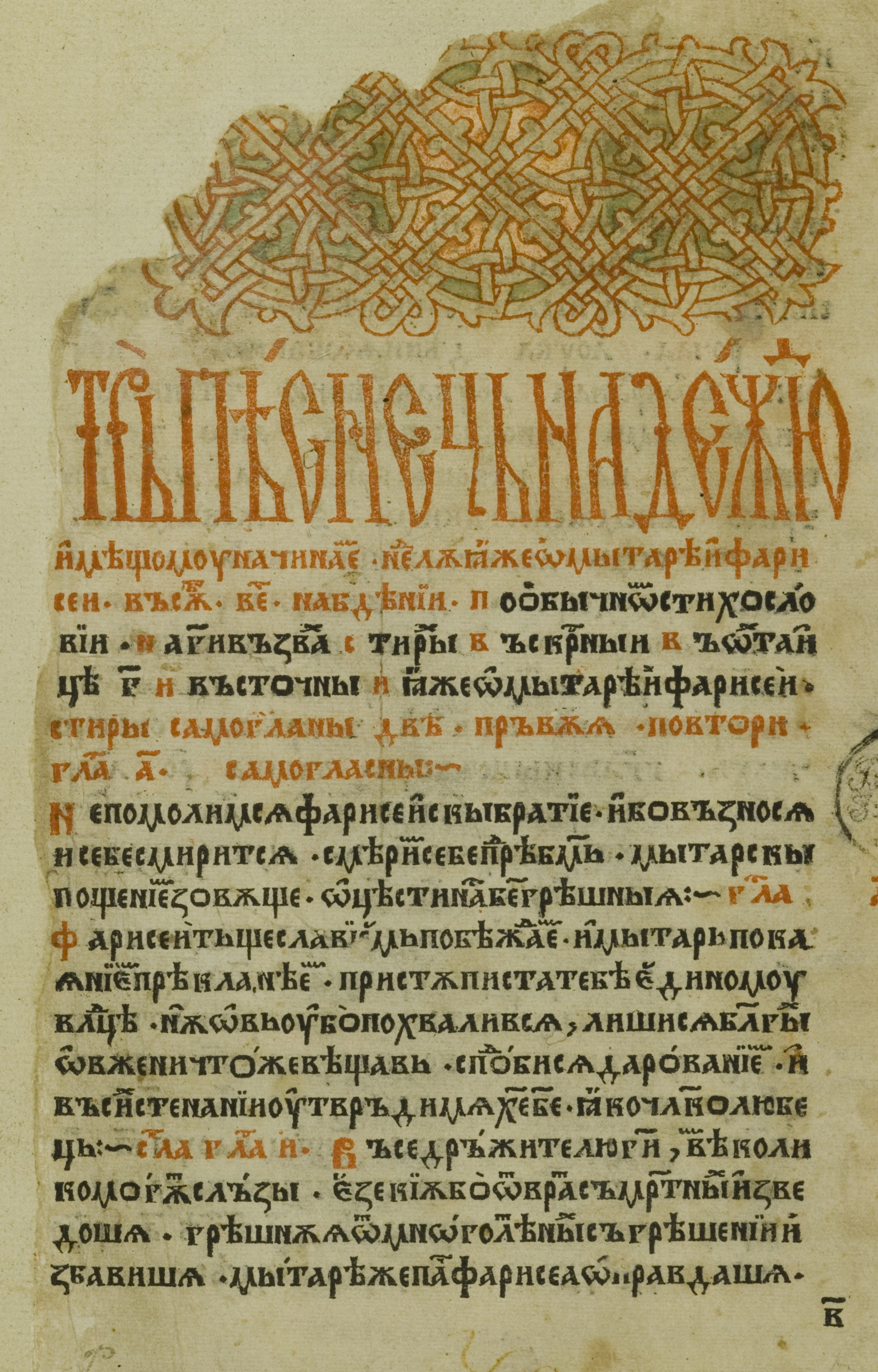
Triod Postnaja print of Swietopelk Printery, Cracow 1491.

The Triodion (Greek: Τριῴδιον, Triōdion; Church Slavonic: Постнаѧ Трїωдь, Postnaya Triod; Romanian: Triodul, Albanian: Triod/Triodi), also called the Lenten Triodion (Τριῴδιον κατανυκτικόν, Triodion katanyktikon), is a liturgical book used by the Eastern Orthodox and Byzantine Catholic churches. The book contains the propers for the fasting period preceding Pascha (Easter) and for the weeks leading up to the fast.

The canons for weekday Matins in the Triodion contain only three odes and so are known as "triodes", after which the Triodion takes its name. The period that the book covers extends from the Sunday of the Publican and Pharisee (the tenth week before Pascha: twenty-two days before the beginning of Great Lent), and concludes with the Midnight Office of Holy Saturday.

The Triodion contains the propers for:

- The Pre-Lenten period, begins with a week in which there is no fasting, including on Wednesdays and Fridays, which are normally kept as fast days throughout the year (with few exceptions).
- The Apokreo marks the change of diet to the fasting practice of Lent: meat is no longer eaten after the "First Apokreo Sunday" (i.e. the 8th Sunday before Easter). Apókreō (in Greek, the "Leave-taking from Meat") coincides with the Carnival celebrations which, although officially discouraged by the Church as pagan remnants, are very popular.
- The week following Apokreo is Tyrinĕ which culminates on Tyrinē Sunday (literally "Cheese Sunday" or "Second Apokreo Sunday") and just before Clean Monday, where milk and dairy products can be consumed but not meat or eggs.
- "Clean Monday" signifies the first day of "The Forty Days of Great Lent" (or "the Lenten Fast"), meals focus on a vegan type diet including fish and exclusion of oil on certain days. Fasting ends on Good Friday and celebrations commence Easter/Palm Sunday). This period also coincides with the springtime birth of new lambs.
- Great and Holy Week (up to and including the Midnight Office of Great and Holy Saturday)

In the edition of the Lenten Triodion used by the Old Believers and those who follow the Ruthenian recension, the contents of the Triodion end with the service of Lazarus Saturday and do not contain the services of Holy Week, which are to be found in the Pentecostarion.

== See also ==
- Paschal cycle
- Pentecostarion—the companion volume for the Easter period
