= Menaion =

Liturgical book used by the Eastern Orthodox Church

The Menaion (Koine Greek: Μηναῖον, romanized: Mēnaîon, pronounced [miˈne.on], pl. Μηναῖα, Mēnaîa, [miˈne.a]; Church Slavonic: Минїѧ, romanized: Miníyę, lit. 'of the month') is the liturgical book used by the Eastern Orthodox Church and Eastern Catholic Churches which follow the Byzantine Rite, containing the propers for fixed dates of the calendar year, i.e. entities not dependent on the date of Easter.

The Menaion is the largest volume of the propers for the Byzantine Rite and is used at nearly all the daily services.

== Editions ==
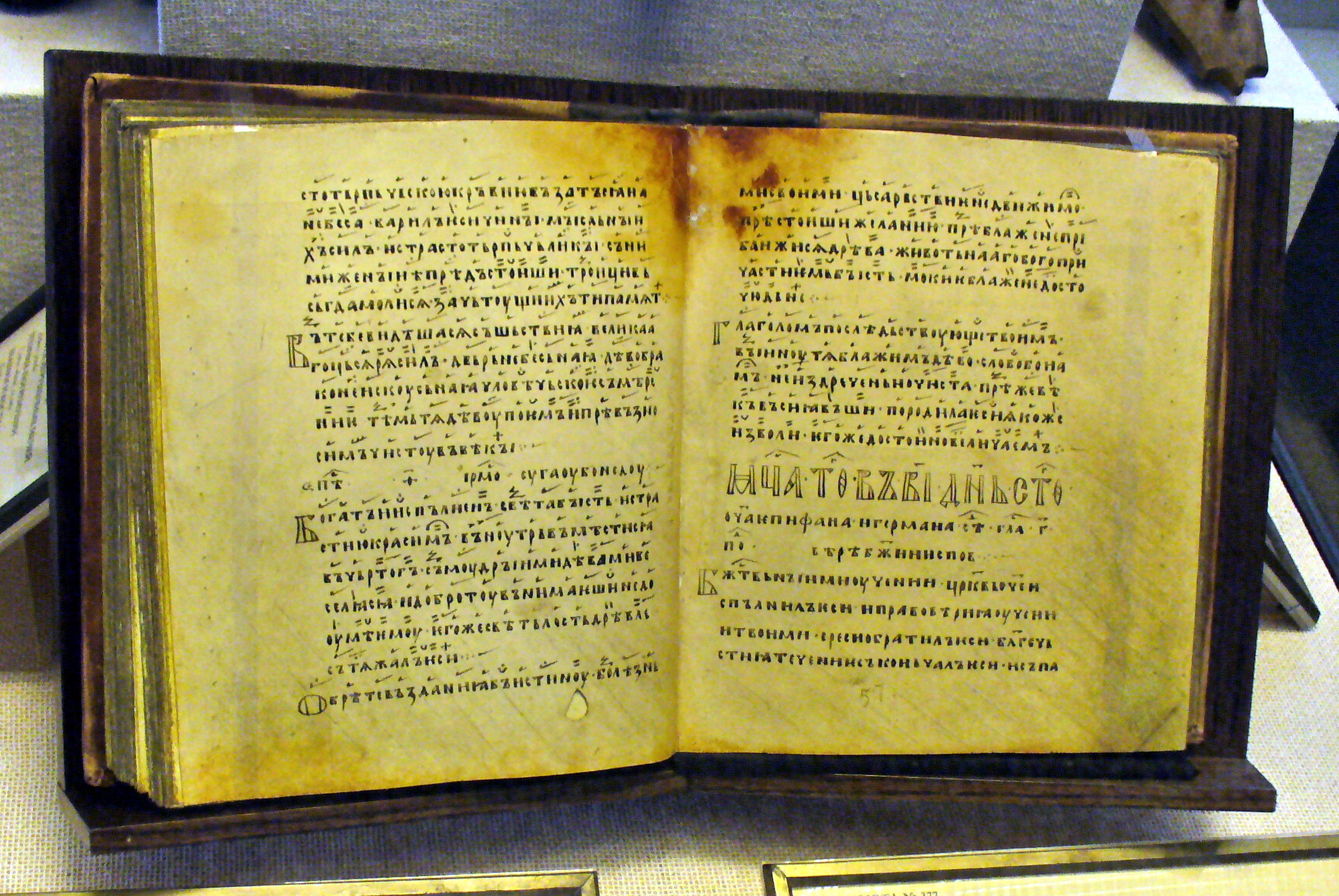
A Menaion in the Church Slavonic language, 12th century, Novgorod

The complete Menaion is published in twelve volumes, one for each month; the first volume is for September which commences the Byzantine liturgical year.

The Festal Menaion is an abridged version containing texts for those great feasts falling on the fixed cycle, some editions also containing feasts of the major saints.

The General Menaion contains services for each type of celebration (apostles, martyrs, etc.) with blank spaces for the name of the saint(s) commemorated. Originating before the invention of printing when the enormous volume of the complete Menaion could not be copied for every church, this is still used for saints that do not have complete services, e.g., for the patron feast of a church named after a minor saint; it is also used by missions and parishes unable to afford a complete Menaion.

Supplementary volumes to the Menaion exist for local saints, e.g., one for all the Saints of the Kyiv Pechersk Lavra, or for newly canonized saints or icons which have their own locally observed feasts.

== Calendar ==
Since 1921, there have been two calendars in use within the Orthodox Church: the Julian Calendar and the Revised Julian Calendar. (Note: which is aligned with the Gregorian Calendar) As of the 21st century there is a thirteen-day difference between the two calendars, so where the former is used, any given fixed date occurs thirteen days later than where the latter is used, e.g., Christmas is fixed on December 25, but where the Julian calendar is used, that date falls on what is commonly known as January 7. The date of Pascha, however, is everywhere reckoned using the Julian Calendar, resulting in differing interactions between the Paschal cycle and the fixed cycle, e.g. the Annunciation may fall as late as Bright Wednesday where the Julian Calendar is used but only as late as the Thursday before Palm Sunday where the revised calendar is used.

== Icons ==
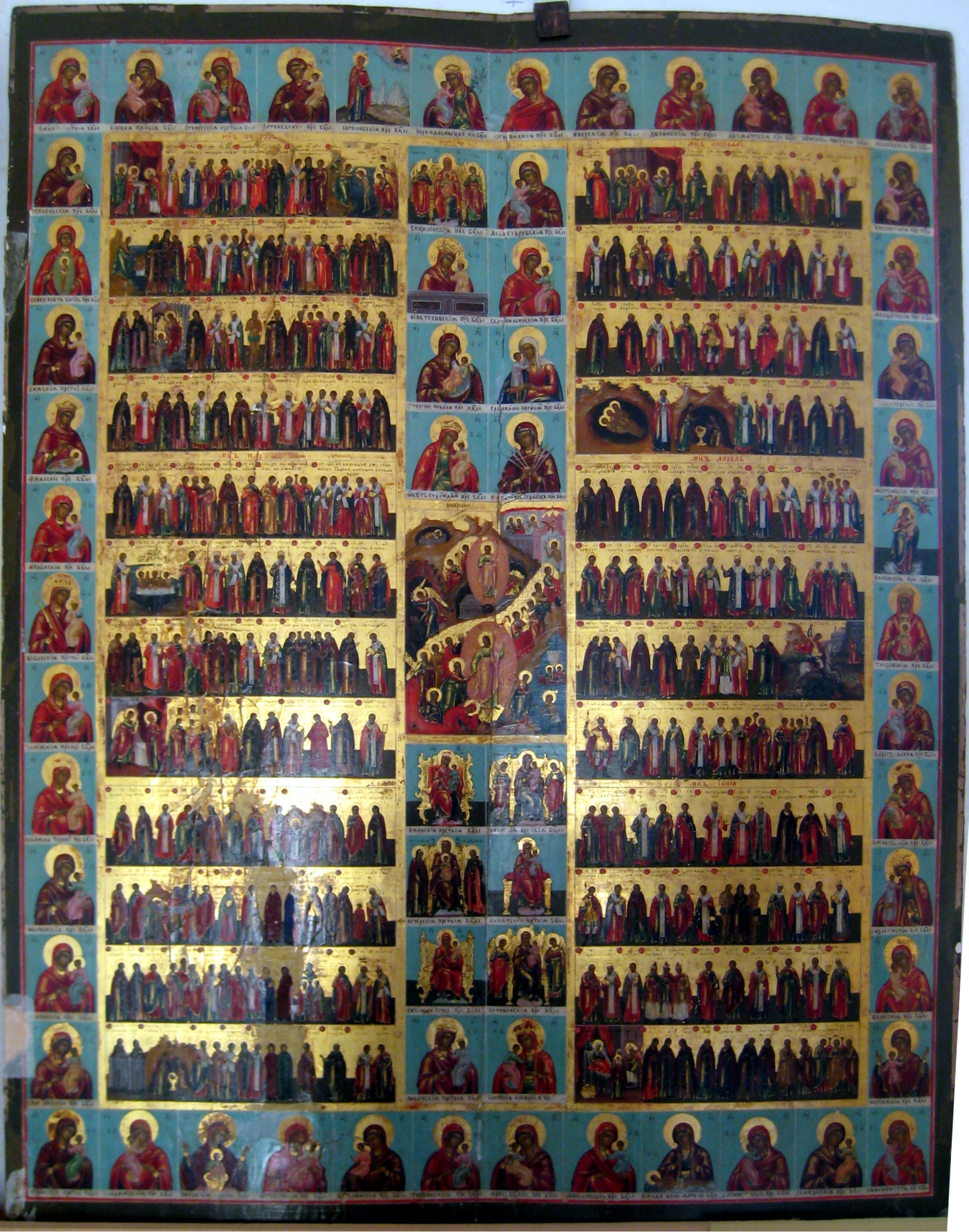
Russian icon with menaion (ru: минея)

The term "Menaion" is also applied to icons of all the saints whose feast days fall within a particular month. A particular church may have 12 such icons, one for each month of the year, or it may have one large icon depicting all 12 months on one panel.

== See also ==
- Calendar of Saints
- Pentecostarion
- Menologium
- Synaxarion
- Triodion

== Bibliography ==
- Review of ''Festal Menaion'' translated by Mother Mary and Archimandrite Kallistos Ware, "Theology Today" 35 (1978) July, 241-243.
- Wikisource has the article of the Catholic Encyclopedia, edition of 1913, which is now in the public domain: look at Menaion
