= Kassia =

Byzantine-Greek composer and hymnographer (810–865)

Saint Kassia
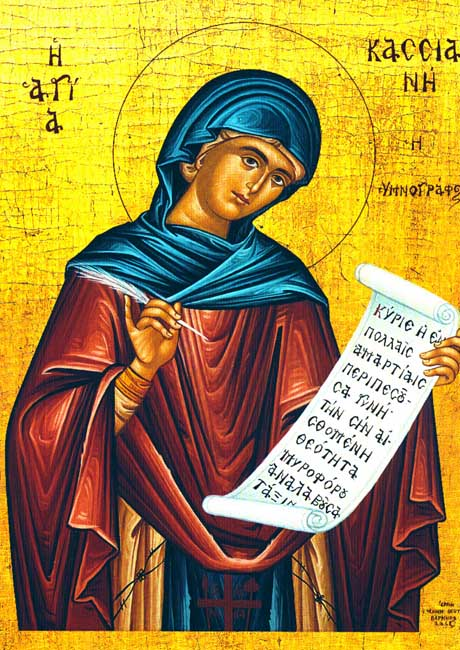
- Icon of St. Kassia
- Born: c. 810; Constantinople (modern-day Istanbul, Turkey)
- Died: c. 865; Kasos
- Venerated in: Eastern Orthodox Church; Catholic Church; Anglican Communion
- Canonized: Pre-congregation
- Feast: 7 September

Kassia, Cassia, Kassiane, or Kassiani (Greek: Κασσιανή, romanized: Kassianí, pronounced [kasia'ni]; c. 810 – c.865) was a Byzantine-Greek composer, hymnographer and poet. She holds a unique place in Byzantine music as the only known woman whose music appears in the Byzantine liturgy. Approximately fifty of her hymns are extant, most of which are stichera, though at least 26 have uncertain attribution. The authenticity issues are due to many hymns being anonymous, and others ascribed to different authors in different manuscripts. She was an abbess of a convent in the west of Constantinople.

Additionally, many epigrams and gnomic verses are attributed to her, at least 261. Kassia is notable as one of at least two women in the middle Byzantine period known to have written in their own names, the other being Anna Comnena. Like her predecessors Romanos the Melodist and Andrew of Crete, the earliest surviving manuscripts of her works are dated centuries after her lifetime.

== Name ==
Her name is a feminine Greek form of the Latin name Cassius. It is variously spelled Κασσιανή (contemporary pronunciation [kaˈsçani]), Κασ(σ)ία (Kas[s]ia), Εικασία (Eikasia), Ικασία (Ikasia), Kassiani, Cas[s]ia, Cassiane, Kassiana. Modern English-language references to her as a composer generally use the name "Kassia," while references to her religious life tend to use Kassia or Kassiani.

== Life ==
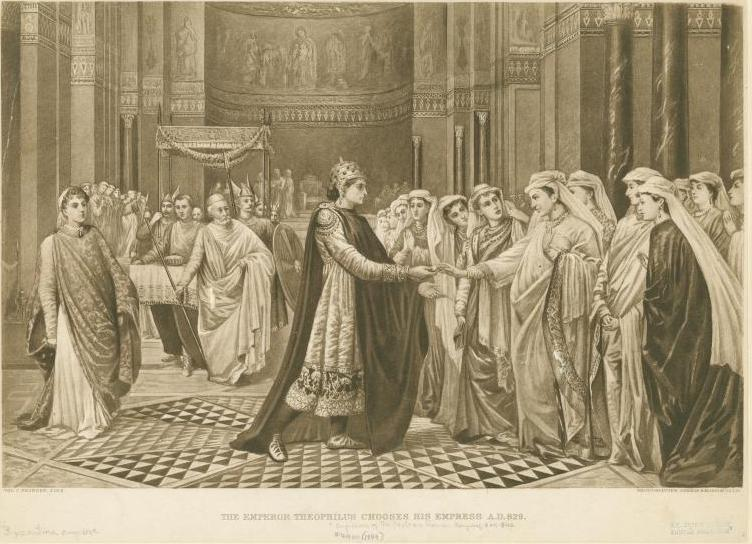
19th century representation by Valentine Cameron Prinsep of Theophilos' choice

Kassia was born between 805 and 810 in Constantinople into a wealthy family and grew to be exceptionally beautiful and intelligent. Three Byzantine chroniclers, Pseudo-Symeon the Logothete, George the Monk (a.k.a. George the Sinner) and Leo the Grammarian, claim that she was a participant in a "bride show"—the means by which Byzantine princes/emperors sometimes chose a bride, by giving a golden apple to his choice—organized for the young bachelor Theophilos by his stepmother, the Empress Dowager Euphrosyne. Smitten by Kassia's beauty, the young emperor approached her and said: "Through a woman [came forth] the baser [things]," referring to the sin and suffering coming as a result of Eve's transgression. Kassia promptly responded, "And through a woman [came forth] the better [things]," referring to the hope of salvation resulting from the Incarnation of Christ through the Virgin Mary. According to tradition, the verbatim dialogue was:

"-Ἐκ γυναικὸς τὰ χείρω." Medieval Greek: [ek ʝyne'kos ta 'çiro]
"-Kαὶ ἐκ γυναικὸς τὰ κρείττω." Medieval Greek: [c(e) ek ʝyneˈkos ta ˈkrito]

Unsatisfied with her response, Theophilos rejected her and chose Theodora as his wife.

By 843, Kassia had founded a convent in the west of Constantinople, near the Constantinian Walls, and became its first abbess. Although one view holds that her decision to enter monastic life was motivated by bitterness at having failed to marry Theophilos and become empress, a letter from Theodore the Studite indicates that she had religious motivations for embracing the monastic life. Since monastic life was a common vocation in her time, religious devotion may have been as important a motive as disappointment or the pursuit of artistic renown. Her convent had a close relationship with the nearby monastery of Stoudios, which played a central role in re-editing the Byzantine liturgical books in the 9th and 10th centuries, thus helping to preserve her work.

Emperor Theophilos was a fierce iconoclast, and any residual feelings he may have had for Kassia did not preserve her from the imperial policy of persecution for her defence of the veneration of icons. Among other things, she was subjected to scourging with a lash. In spite of this, she remained outspoken in defence of the Orthodox Faith, at one point saying, "I hate silence when it is time to speak."

After the death of Theophilos in 842 his young son Michael III became Eastern Roman Emperor, with Empress Theodora acting as Regent. Together they ended the second iconoclastic period (814–843); peace was restored to the empire.

Kassia traveled to Italy briefly, but eventually settled on the Greek Island of Kasos, where she died sometime around 865. In the city of Panaghia, there is a church where Kassia's tomb/reliquary may be found.

== Works ==
=== Overview ===
Kassiani wrote many hymns which are still used in the Byzantine liturgy to this day. She became known to the great Theodore the Studite, while she was still a young girl, and he was impressed by her learning and literary style. She not only wrote spiritual poetry, but composed music to accompany it. She is regarded as an "exceptional and rare phenomenon" among composers of her day. At least twenty-three genuine hymns are ascribed to her. Her oeuvre as a whole demonstrates influence from classical Greek literature, which she studied early in life.

=== Sacred music ===
==== Hymn of Kassia ====
The most famous of her compositions is the eponymous Hymn of Kassia (also known as the Troparion of Kassiani), which is chanted each year for Great and Holy Wednesday as a doxastichon occurring at the end of the aposticha of orthros and the lamp-lighting psalms of the Presanctified Liturgy.

Tradition says that in his later years the Emperor Theophilus, still in love with her, wished to see her one more time before he died, so he rode to the monastery where she resided. Kassia was alone in her cell, writing her Hymn when she realized that the commotion she heard was because the imperial retinue had arrived. She was still in love with him but was now devoted to God and hid away because she did not want to let her old passion overcome her monastic vow. She left the unfinished hymn on the table. Theophilus found her cell and entered it alone. He looked for her but she was not there; she was hiding in a closet, watching him. Theophilus, overcome with sadness, cried and regretted that moment of pride when he rejected such a beautiful and intellectual woman; then he noticed the papers on the table and read them. When he had finished reading, he sat and added one line to the hymn; then he left. The line attributed to the Emperor is the line "those feet whose sound Eve heard at dusk in Paradise and hid herself for fear." Legend says that as he was leaving he noticed Kassia in the closet but did not speak to her, out of respect for her wished privacy. Kassia emerged when the emperor was gone, read what he had written and finished the hymn.

The hymn’s music is slow, sorrowful, and plaintive, lasting approximately ten to twenty minutes depending on tempo and style of execution. It requires a wide vocal range and is regarded as one of the most demanding works of solo Byzantine chant. It is also performed by choirs in unison, often accompanied by a Byzantine vocal bass drone.

==== Other hymns ====
Among the other hymns she composed are the following:

- The Doxastichon chanted at the Vesperal Divine Liturgy on Christmas Eve
- Numerous hymns in honor of saints found in the Menaion (fixed cycle of the Eastern Orthodox liturgical calendar), such as Feast of the Nativity of the Forerunner, 24 June.
- Among her hymns in the Triodion (liturgical book used during Great Lent) are the irmoi for the Matins Canons of Great and Holy Thursday and Great and Holy Saturday.
- Her longest composition is a Canon for the Departed, consisting of 32 strophes, to be chanted at a Parastas (memorial services).

=== Secular writings ===
261 works of secular literature are attributed to Kassia, consisting of epigrams and gnomic verses. Never set to music, they were written during the reigns of Theophilos and Michael III. Akin to the rest of her oeuvre, her writings demonstrate influence from classical Greek literature, which she studied early in life. These literary genres were chiefly dominated by men, so her contributions would have been unusual; Byzantinist Andrew Mellas noted that "perhaps this was an advantage for Kassia and accounts for her originality".

The genre of epigrams had existed from classical antiquity and into the Byzantine Empire, being defined as somewhere in between the scope of lyric and epic poetry. Their exact organization was unformalized, ranging from the use of couplets to iambic pentameter, among others. The works are generally rooted in the long tradition, though they include her own unique innovations. In this genre, she is credited with first synthesizing secular and sacred values. While the works are secular in character, they promoted ethical teachings for the lives of Christians. Byzantinist Marc Lauxtermann described this approach as "An osmosis of ancient wisdom and monastic truth". Kassia abandoned typical themes found in Greek prosody, preferring to discuss more individual and personal issues. In addition to ethnical ideals, the themes Kassia covers include ethnical ideals and weaknesses (her examples include 'foolishness' and 'friendship'); social structures; femininity (particularly 'beauty'); and the defense of women's rights. This approach would have made the genre more relevant and accessible to the Byzantine people, though the extent of her epigrams' circulation remains unclear. Her epigrams are particularly reminiscent of similar works by her colleague Theodore the Studite, and are characterized by a concise and straight forward presentation, often including witty or humorous elements. According to Mellas, it is probable that they were "a form Catechism for her nuns and perhaps any friends of the monastery."

Kassia's gnomic verses were much shorter, usually a single-verse teachings. They often include moral adages and like the epigrams, were succinct.

== Portrayals ==
Many fictitious stories were created around her relationship with Emperor Theophilos. Contemporary historians such as Glykas, Ptochoprodromos, Kodinos, Zonaras, and Georgios Amartolos described her exile in Italy during the Iconoclasy wars and later settled and died in Kasos sometime between 867 and 890.

A fictional version of her is portrayed by Karima McAdams in the 5th season of the television series Vikings.

In August 2019, English singer-songwriter Frank Turner included a song told from her point of view on his album No Man's Land.

== Religious commemoration ==
The feast day of Saint Kassiani is celebrated by the Orthodox Church on 7 September.

She is often depicted on the icon of the Sunday of Orthodoxy (the First Sunday of Great Lent), because of her strong defence of the veneration of icons.

In 2022, Kassia was officially added to the Episcopal Church liturgical calendar with a feast day on 7 September.

== Recordings ==
The following are commercial recordings of the music of Kassia:

- Kronos Quartet: Early Music (Lachrymæ Antiquæ), USA 1997. Includes an instrumental arrangement of Kassia's "Using the Apostate Tyrant as His Tool".
- Sarband : Sacred Women, Women as Composers and Performers of Medieval Chant. Dorian, USA 2001. Album contains one piece by Kassia, Augustus-Sticheron Idiomelon Doxastikon: Vespers of 25 December (Athens MS 883) which is also recorded on the album by VocaMe.
- Deborah Kayser & Nick Tsiavos The Fallen Woman CD released 2008. Includes a recording of the Kassia Hymn.
- VocaMe : Kassia - Byzantine hymns of the first woman composer. Christophorus, Germany 2009. 18 tracks, with full sung texts in Greek script, German and English translations.
- Choral Settings of Kassiani: with members of Cappella Romana and the English Chamber Choir. Various recordings of the Troparion of Kassiani and When Augustus Reigned. Released in 2011.
- Hymns of Kassiani, hymns of Christmas, the Triodion and Holy Week. Cappella Romana, Alexander Lingas. Released in 2021.

== Sources ==
Books and chapters

- Brashier, Rachel Nicole (2012). Voice of Women in Byzantine Music Within the Greek Orthodox Churches in America. Carbondale: Southern Illinois University Carbondale. OCLC 810092479.
- Mellas, Andrew (2020). Liturgy and the Emotions in Byzantium: Compunction and Hymnody. Cambridge: Cambridge University Press. doi:10.1017/9781108767361. ISBN 978-1-108-76736-1. S2CID 225623021.
- The Festal Menaion. The Service Books of the Orthodox Church. Translated by Mother Mary; Ware, Kallistos. London: Faber & Faber. 1977.
- The Lenten Triodion. The Service Books of the Orthodox Church. Translated by Mother Mary; Ware, Kallistos. South Canaan, PA: St. Tikhon's Seminary Press. 2002.
- Silvas, Anna M. (2006). "Kassia the Nun". In Garland, Lynda (ed.). Byzantine Women: Varieties of Experience 800-1200. Farnham: Ashgate Publishing.
- Stephenson, Paul, ed. (2010). The Byzantine World. Taylor & Francis. p. 66. ISBN 9780203817254.
- Touliatos, Diane (1996). "Kassia". In Schleifer, Martha Furman; Glickman, Sylvia (eds.). Women Composers: Music Through The Ages. Vol. 1: Composers Born Before 1599. New York: G. K. Hall. ISBN 978-0-8161-0926-5.

Encyclopedia and journal articles

- Dyck, Andrew R. (1986). "On Cassia, κυριε Ηεν πολλαις". Byzantion. 56. Peeters: 63–76. JSTOR 44160984.
- Evangelatou, Maria (2014). "Threads of Power: Clothing Symbolism, Human Salvation, and Female Identity in the Illustrated Homilies by Iakobos of Kokkinobaphos". Dumbarton Oaks Papers. 68: 241–323. JSTOR 24643760.
- Kazhdan, A. P.; Talbot, A.-M. (1991–1992). "Women and Iconoclasm". Byzantinische Zeitschrift. 84–85 (2): 391–408. doi:10.1515/byzs.1992.84-85.2.391. S2CID 191604164.
- Kazhdan, Alexander (2005) [1991]. "Kassia". In Kazhdan, Alexander (ed.). The Oxford Dictionary of Byzantium. Oxford: Oxford University Press. ISBN 978-0-19-504652-6.
- Simic, Kosta (2009). "Life According to Nature: Ascetic Ideals in a Sticheron by Kassia". Annual Journal of the Centre of Church Studies. 6: 111–121.
- Simic, Kosta (January 2011). "Kassia's hymnography in the light of patristic sources and earlier hymnographical works". Zbornik radova Vizantoloskog instituta. 48 (48): 7–37. doi:10.2298/ZRVI1148007S.
- Touliatos-Banker, Diane (Spring 1984). "Women Composers of Medieval Byzantine Chant". College Music Symposium. 24 (1): 62–80. JSTOR 40374217.
- Touliatos, Diane (2001). "Kassia". Grove Music Online. Oxford: Oxford University Press. doi:10.1093/gmo/9781561592630.article.40895. ISBN 978-1-56159-263-0. (subscription, Wikilibrary access, or UK public library membership required)
