= Gospel (liturgy) =

Reading from the Gospels used during various religious services

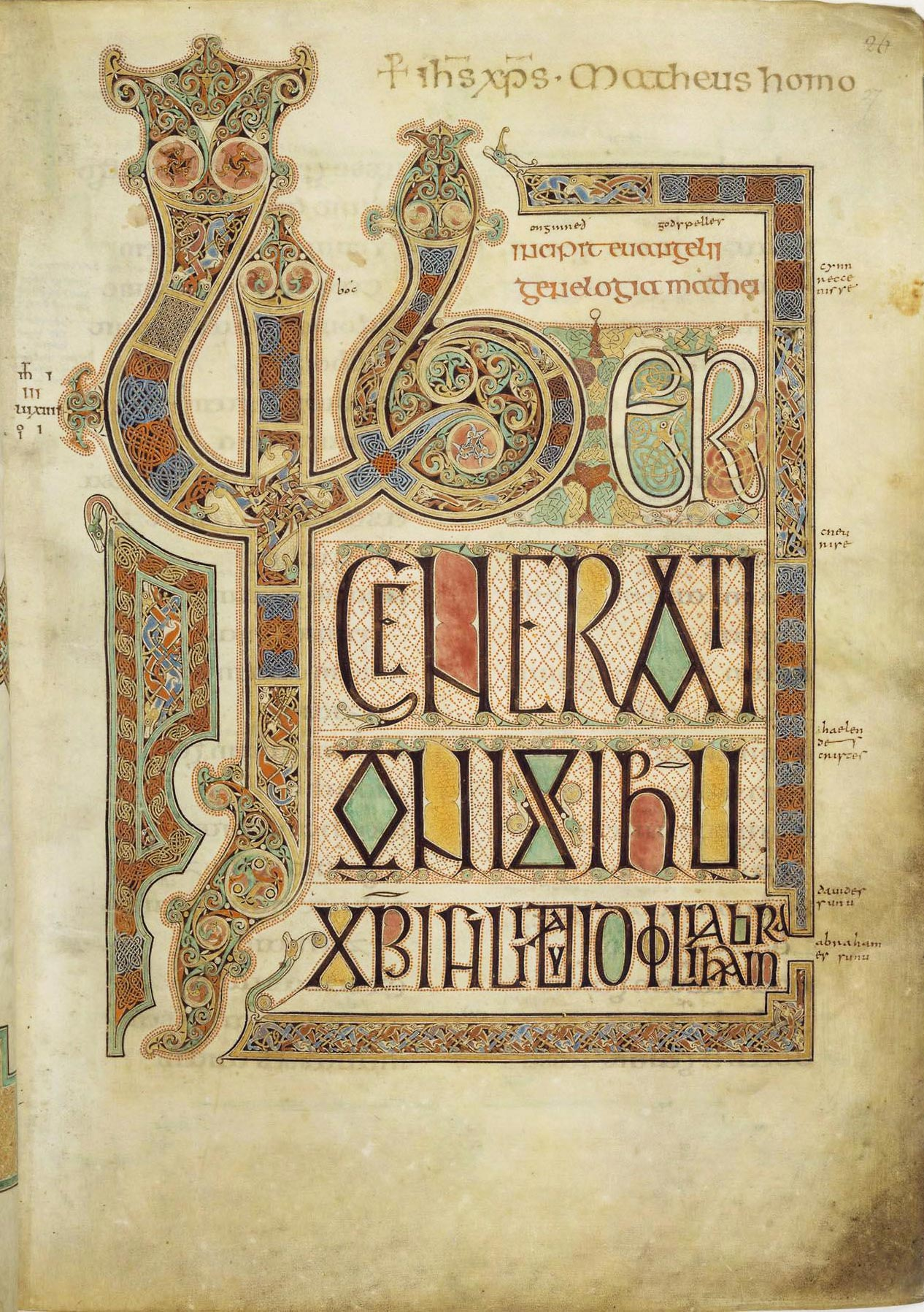
Incipit page from the Gospel of Matthew (Lindisfarne Gospels)

The Gospel in Christian liturgy refers to a reading from the Gospels used during various religious services, including Mass or Divine Liturgy (Eucharist). In many Christian churches, all present stand when a passage from one of the Gospels is read publicly, and sit when a passage from a different part of the Bible is read. The reading of the Gospels, often contained in a liturgical edition containing only the four Gospels (see lectionary), is traditionally done by a minister, priest or deacon, and in many traditions the Gospel Book is brought into the midst of the congregation to be read.

== Usage in the Eastern Christian Churches ==
=== Byzantine Rite ===
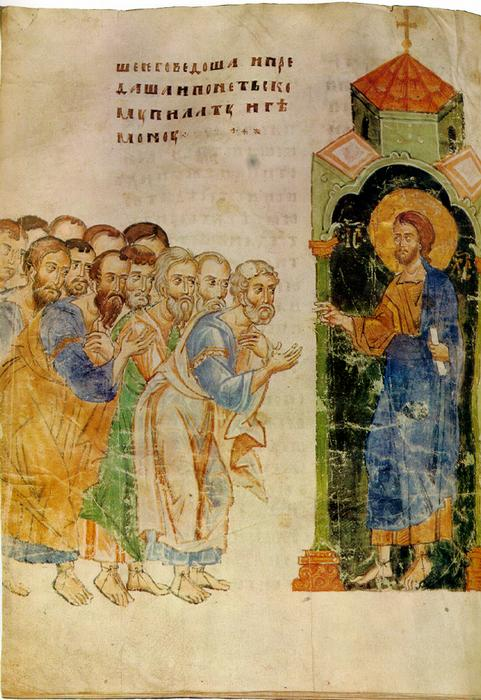
Illustration from the Siysky Gospel (1339)

The Gospel Book, usually decorated with an elaborate metal cover, is normally kept in a central place on the Holy Table (altar), referred to as the High Place. The only other objects that are permitted to occupy this place on the altar are the Antimension, chalice and discos (paten) for the celebration of the Eucharist or, on certain feasts, a Cross or the Epitaphios. The Gospel is considered to be an icon of Christ, and is venerated by kissing, in the same manner as an icon.

The reading of the Gospel is usually preceded by the chanting of a prokimenon or alleluia. The Gospel lesson is not simply read, but is chanted by one of the higher clergy (deacon, priest, or bishop). During the reading of the Gospel, all stand, and at the conclusion of the Gospel, a blessing may be made with the Gospel Book.

==== Divine Liturgy ====
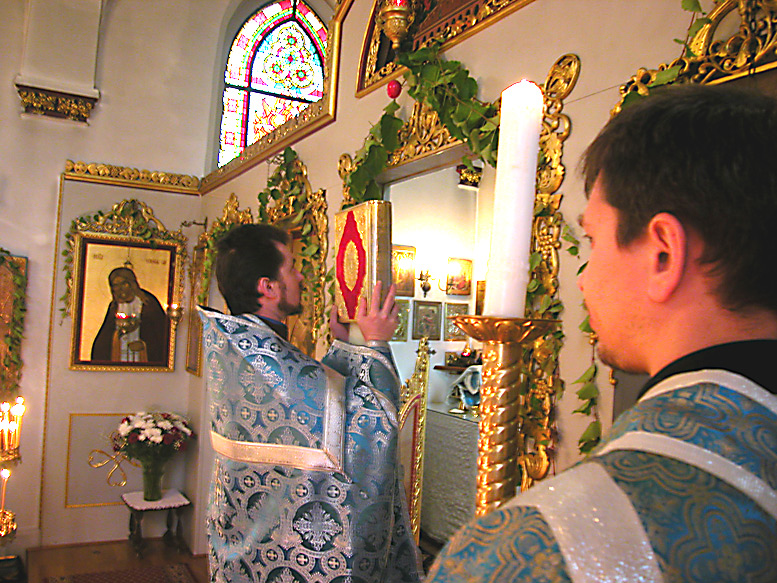
The Little Entrance during the Divine Liturgy (Church of the Protection of the Theotokos, Düsseldorf, Germany)

During the Little Entrance at Divine Liturgy (and sometimes at Vespers), the Gospel is carried in procession from the Holy Table, through the nave of the church, and back into the sanctuary through the Royal Doors.

The Gospel is read after the Alleluia which follows the Prokeimenon and Epistle. During the Alleluia, the deacon (or priest) will perform a brief censing, and the priest says the silent prayer before the Gospel:

Shine forth within our hearts the incorruptible light of Thy knowledge, O Master, Lover of mankind, and open the eyes of our mind to the understanding of the preaching of Thy Gospel; instill in us also the fear of Thy blessed commandments, that, trampling down all lusts of the flesh, we may pursue a spiritual way of life, being mindful of and doing all that is well-pleasing unto Thee. For Thou art the enlightenment of our souls and bodies, O Christ our God, and unto Thee do we send up glory, together with Thine unoriginate Father, and Thy Most-holy and good and life-creating Spirit, now and ever, and unto the ages of ages. Amen.

The deacon will ask a blessing from the celebrating priest or bishop:

Bless, master, the bringer of the Good Tidings of the holy Apostle and Evangelist _______(here he names the author of the Gospel he is about to read).

The priest (or bishop) blesses him saying:

May God, through the intercessions of the holy glorious, all-praised Apostle and Evangelist _______, give speech with great power unto thee that bringest good tidings, unto the fulfillment of the Gospel of His beloved Son, our Lord Jesus Christ.

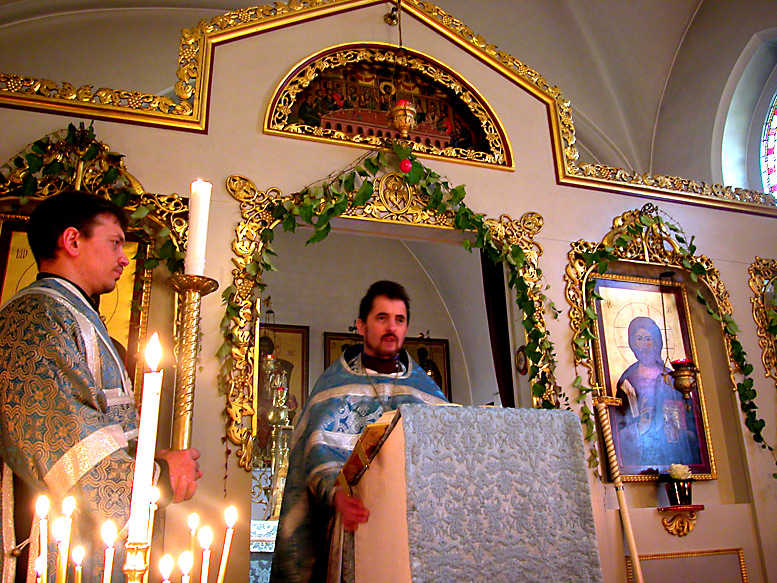
Priest reading the Gospel during the Divine Liturgy

The priest hands him the Gospel Book, and he brings it out to the ambo (in front of the Holy Doors) and places it on an analogion, from which he will read the Gospel facing the Holy Table. If a priest reads the Gospel, he will face the people as he reads. During the reading Altar servers stand to either side holding lit processional candles. In some practices servers also hold hexapteryga (ceremonial fans). In the Greek practice, the deacon may read the Gospel from the Bishop's throne.

Prior to the reading, the following exchange takes place:

Deacon: Wisdom! Arise! Let us listen to the Holy Gospel!

Priest: Peace be unto all.

Choir: And to Thy spirit.

Deacon: The Reading from the Holy Gospel according to _______.

Choir: Glory to Thee, O Lord, glory to Thee!

Priest: Let us attend!

The deacon then reads the selection from the Gospel, after which the priest blesses him:

Priest: Peace be unto thee that bringest good tidings.!

Choir: Glory to Thee, O Lord, glory to Thee!

After the reading, the deacon returns the Gospel Book to the priest who places it in its place on the Holy Table.

==== Other Services ====
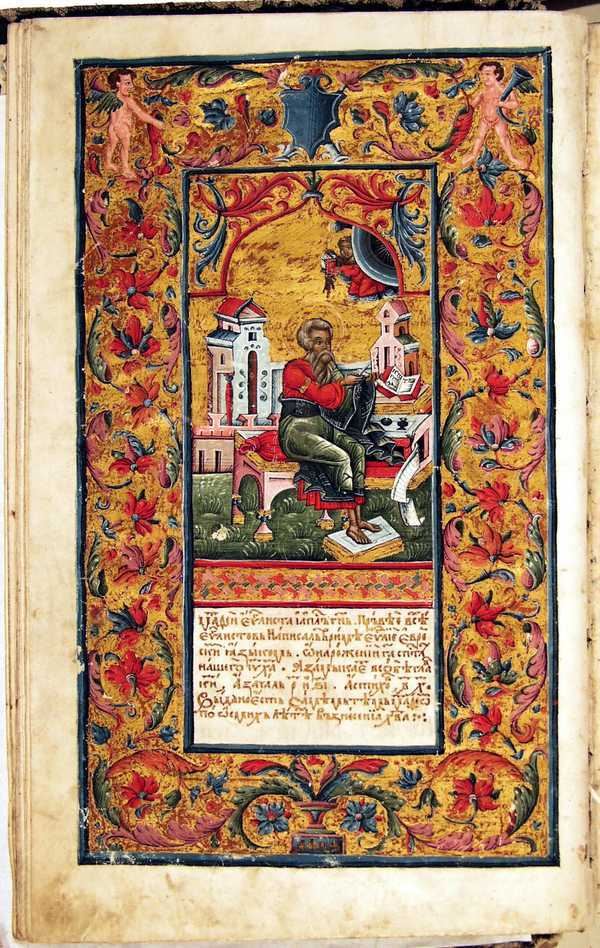
Miniature of St Luke from the Peresopnytsia Gospels (1561)

In the Sunday Matins service the Gospel is always read by the celebrant (the priest or, if he is present, the bishop), rather than the deacon. On Sundays he reads from one of the eleven Matins Gospels, each of which gives an account of the Resurrection of Christ. During the reading, the Gospel Book remains on the Holy Table and the Holy Doors are opened (the Holy Table represents the Tomb of Christ, and the open Holy Doors represent the stone rolled away from the entrance). In this way, both the priest and the congregation face east during the reading (east being the direction the sun rises, symbolizing the Resurrection). Afterward, the priest and deacon bring the Gospel into the center of the Temple, and the faithful venerate the Gospel Book and receive a blessing from the celebrant.

On Weekdays, if there is a higher-ranking feast there will be a Gospel at Matins (normal weekday Matins does not have a Gospel reading). If so, the Gospel is still read by the priest, but from the center of the Temple, facing east, after which he returns the Gospel Book to the Holy Table. Instead of venerating the Gospel Book, the faithful venerate the Icon of the Feast, and receive the celebrant's blessing.

There will also be Gospel readings at other occasional services from the Euchologion. These are usually read by the priest and normally follow the pattern of Matins.

When a bishop or priest passes away and his body is prepared for burial, a Gospel Book is placed in the coffin with him. After the preparation of the body and before the funeral itself begins, it is traditional for the Gospels to be read continuously over him. The reading may be performed by a bishop, priest or deacon. During the funeral procession, the Gospel Book is carried in front of the coffin, and there are several Gospel readings during the funeral.

==== Cycle of readings ====
Gospel pericopes (passages) are assigned for every Sunday, weekday (except during Great Lent), and feast day of the liturgical year. There is always at least one Gospel reading any time the Divine Liturgy is celebrated. There may be up to three Gospel readings at the same service.

The reading is determined according to the annual liturgical calendar. (If a feast falls on a Sunday, the reading for that feast will often be included after or in place of the Sunday reading.) The cycle of readings begins with Pascha (Easter) and the Pentecostarion (the period from Pascha to Pentecost), continues with the Sundays after Pentecost, and concludes with Great Lent and Holy Week. The number of Sundays from one Pascha to the next varies from year to year; in some years, not all the passages for Sundays after Pentecost will be read, while in others, some weeks will have to be repeated.

The entirety of the four Gospels is read in the course of the liturgical year, beginning with John 1:1–17 at the Paschal Vigil. The readings from John end on the Sunday of Pentecost, followed on Holy Spirit Monday (the day after Pentecost) by Matthew, starting in Chapter 4 (the previous chapters covering the Genealogy of Christ through the Nativity are read during the services for Christmas). From the 12th Monday through the 17th Friday after Pentecost, the readings are from the Gospel of St. Mark, with readings from Matt. Ch. 25 on Saturday and Sunday of the 17th week. The 18th Monday after Pentecost begins the readings from Luke, ending on the 29th Sunday. During the remaining weeks, 30–32, the weekday readings are from Mark, the weekend from Luke. The Lenten Triodion (the Orthodox service book containing texts for Great Lent and Holy Week) assigns Gospel readings for Saturdays and Sundays, but not for weekdays. The Divine Liturgy is not celebrated on weekdays of Lent, due to the penitential nature of those days.

Once Great Lent begins (during the service of Vespers on Forgiveness Sunday), there are no Gospel readings on weekdays; instead, three Old Testament readings are appointed, one each from Genesis, Isaiah, and Proverbs (note: the Lenten services have a different structure so as to allow this arrangement of readings without the Gospel; see Liturgy of the Presanctified Gifts). On Saturdays and Sundays, a Gospel is read with a message applicable to what the theme of that Sunday is (e.g. St. Mary of Egypt, the Cross, Restoration of the Icons).

There are Gospel lessons appointed for Vespers, Matins and Presanctified Liturgy on Monday, Tuesday and Wednesday of Holy Week. Also, on these days the four gospels are read in their entirety at the Little Hours, stopping at John 13:32.

There is a Vesperal Divine Liturgy on Great Thursday, at which the Gospel lesson is a concatenation taken from all four Gospels. The remainder of the Gospel of John (13:33 ff.), together with readings from the other Gospels having to do with the Passion, is read at Matins of Great Friday at a service called the Twelve Passion Gospels. There will also be Gospel lessons at each of the Royal Hours on Great Friday, and at the Vesperal Liturgy on Holy Saturday.

In the Greek practice, there is a reading of the Resurrectional Gospel at Midnight, during the procession of the Paschal Vigil. In the Slavic tradition there is no Gospel reading at the procession, but both traditions have a Gospel at the Paschal Divine Liturgy which concludes the vigil.

== Uses in the Western Christian Churches ==
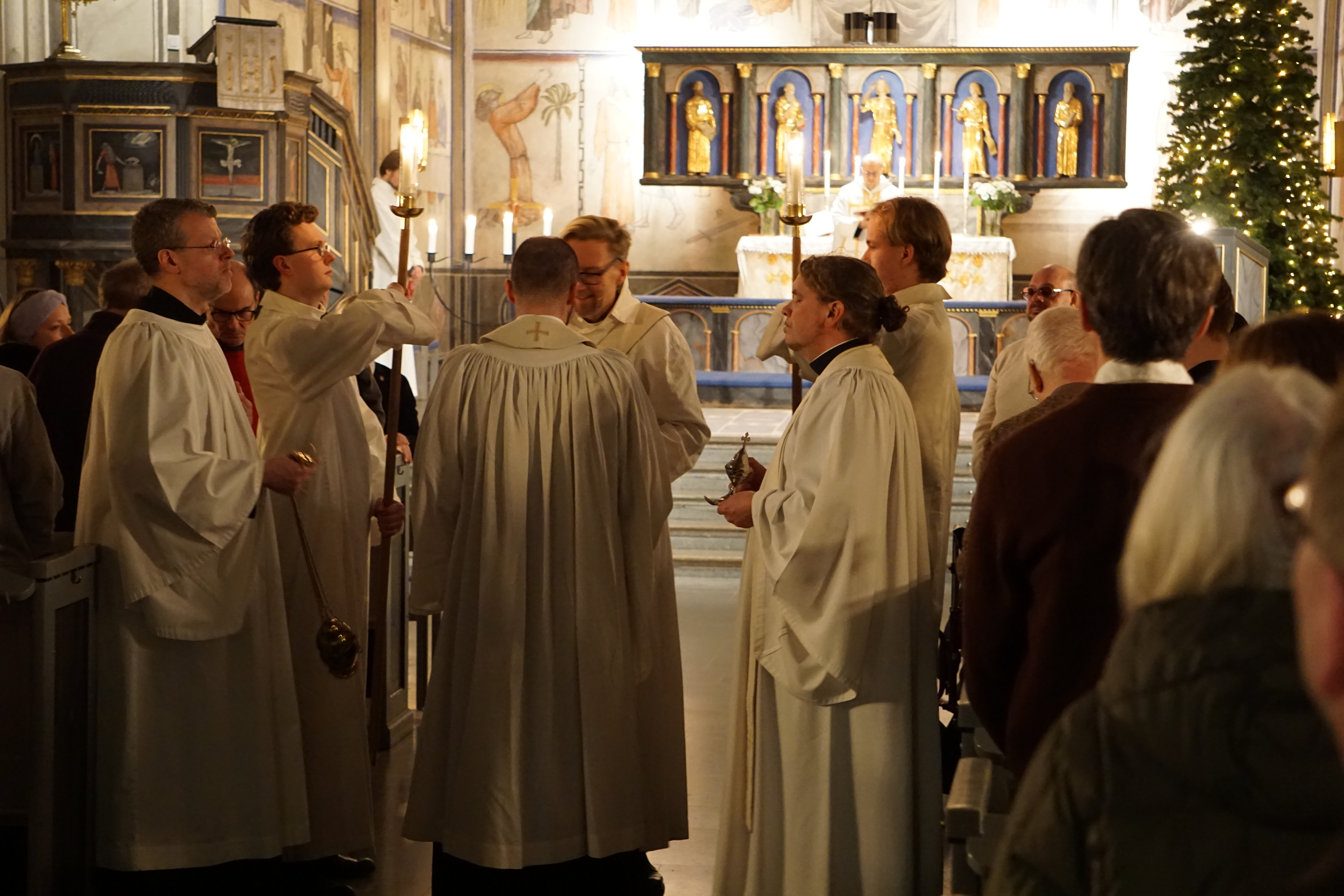
The priest and acolytes during the Gospel reading at Saint Matthew's Evangelical-Lutheran Church at Midnight Mass on Christmas Eve

Many Western Christian churches follow a Lectionary cycle of readings, such as the Revised Common Lectionary, which uses a three-year cycle of readings.

In the Roman Catholic Church, a passage from one of the gospels is placed between the Alleluia or Tract and the Credo in the Mass. In a High Mass, it is chanted in a special tone (the Tonus Evangelii).

In the Evangelical-Lutheran Mass (Divine Service), the priest/pastor reads a passage from one of the gospels before the homily.

The reading of the Gospel during an Evangelical-Lutheran Mass at Vadstena Abbey Church in Sweden

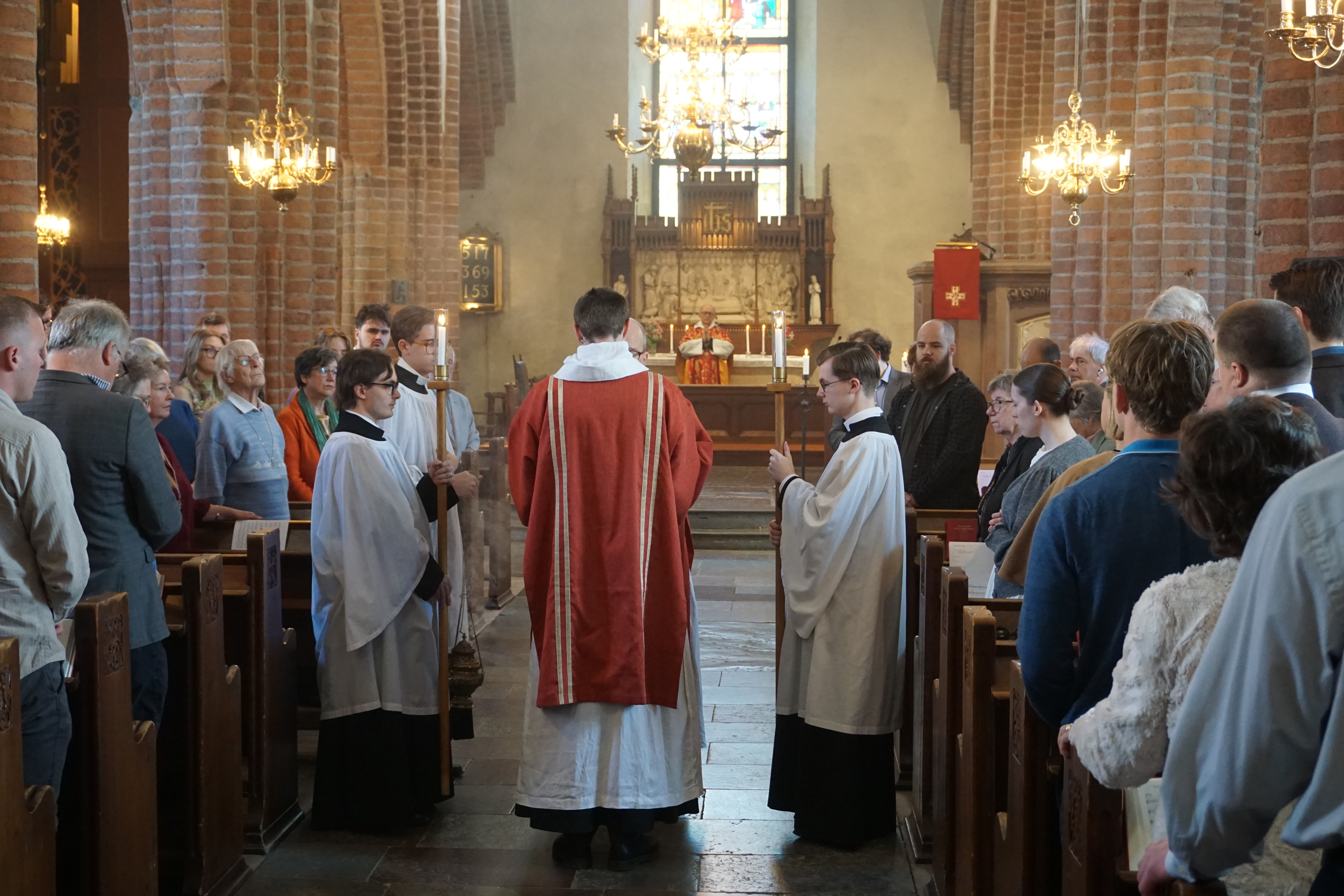
The reading of the Gospel during an Evangelical-Lutheran Mass at the Church of Holy Trinity (Helga Trefaldighets Kyrka) in Uppsala, Sweden.

A procession at the time of the Gospel reading during an Evangelical-Lutheran Mass at Vadstena Abbey Church in Sweden

In Anglican Churches it is customary for the deacon or priest to read the Gospel from either the pulpit or to process to part way along the aisle and to read the Gospel from a Bible or lectionary that is being held by an altar server.
