= Holy Tuesday =

Day of Holy Week in Christianity

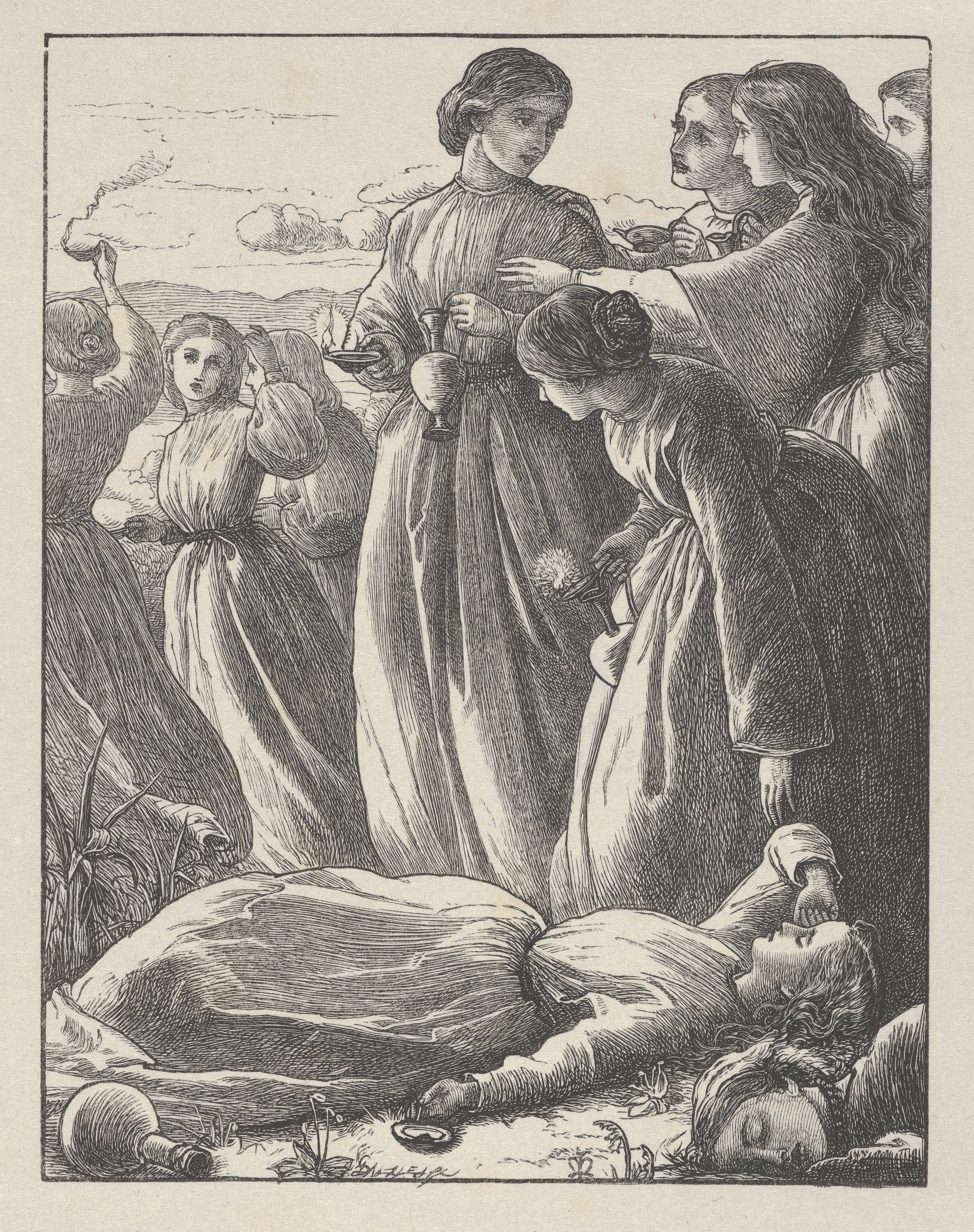
- The wise and the foolish virgins
- Also called: Great and Holy Tuesday; Fig Tuesday; Megali Triti
- Observed by: Christians
- Type: Christian
- Significance: Commemorates the Parable of the Ten Virgins and the Parable of the talents or minas
- Observances: Mass or Service of Worship
- Date: Tuesday before Easter
- 2025 date: April 15 (Western); April 15 (Eastern)
- 2026 date: March 31 (Western); April 7 (Eastern)
- 2027 date: March 23 (Western); April 27 (Eastern)
- 2028 date: April 11 (Western); April 11 (Eastern)
- Frequency: annual
- Related to: Holy Week

Holy Tuesday or Great and Holy Tuesday (Ancient Greek: Μεγάλη Τρίτη, Megali Triti) (lit. 'Great Third (Day)', i.e., Great Tuesday), also known as Fig Tuesday, is a day of Holy Week, which precedes Easter. As with other days of Holy Week, this day is observed through the holding of church services.

== Nomenclature ==
Holy Tuesday is also known as Fig Tuesday "as it commemorates the day Jesus returned to Jerusalem from Bethany, passing a barren fig tree on the way, which he used as an example to teach his disciples." The passages discussing this are found in the Gospels of Matthew and Mark.

== Western Christianity ==
Holy Tuesday and other named days and day ranges around Lent and Easter in Western Christianity, with the fasting days of Lent numbered

In the Roman Catholic Church, the readings for the Novus Ordo are Isaiah 49:1-6; Psalm 71:1-6, Psalm 71:15, Psalm 71:17; 1 Corinthians 1:18-31; and John 13:21-33, John 13:36-38. In the older form of the Mass known as the Tridentine Mass the readings are taken from Jeremiah 11:18-20 and the Gospel according to St. Mark 14:1-72; Mark 15:1-46. In the 1955 Holy Week Reform, the first 31 verses of the 14th chapter of St. Mark were removed. Those 31 verses are retained in the Roman Catholic Churches which celebrate the pre-1955 Holy Week.

In the Revised Common Lectionary, which is used by the Anglican Communion, Methodist Churches, Lutheran Churches, Old Catholic Churches and some Reformed Churches, the Scripture lessons are Isaiah 49:1-7 (First Reading), Psalm 71:1-14 (Psalm), 1 Corinthians 1:18-31 (Second Reading), and John 12:20-36 (Gospel Reading).

In traditional Methodist usage, The Book of Worship for Church and Home (1965) provides the following Collect for Holy Tuesday:

Almighty, everlasting God, grant us so perfectly to follow the passion of our Lord, that we may obtain the help and pardon of his all-sufficient grace; through him who lives and reigns with you, in the unity of the Holy Spirit, world without end. Amen.

== Eastern Christianity ==
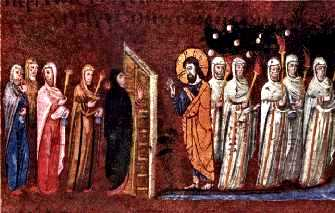
The Wise and Foolish Virgins (from the Rossano Gospels).

In the Eastern Orthodox Church, Armenian Apostolic church and those Eastern Catholic Churches that follow the Byzantine Rite, this day is referred to as Great and Holy Tuesday, or Great Tuesday. On this day the Church commemorates the Parable of the Ten Virgins (Matthew 25:1-13), which forms one of the themes of the first three days of Holy Week, with its teaching about vigilance, and Christ as the Bridegroom. The bridal chamber is used as a symbol not only of the Tomb of Christ, but also of the blessed state of the saved on the Day of Judgement. The theme of the Parable of the Talents (Matthew 25:14-30) is also developed in the hymns of this day.

The day begins liturgically with Vespers on the afternoon of Great Monday, repeating some of the same stichera (hymns) from the night before. At Great Compline a triode (Canon composed of three Odes), written by St. Andrew of Crete is chanted.

The Matins service for Monday through Wednesday of Holy Week is known as the Bridegroom Service or Bridegroom Prayer, because of their theme of Christ as the Bridegroom of the Church, a theme movingly expressed in the troparion that is solemnly chanted during them. On these days, an icon of "Christ the Bridegroom" is placed on an analogion in the center of the temple, portraying Jesus wearing the purple robe of mockery and crowned with a crown of thorns (see Instruments of the Passion). These Matins services are often chanted the evening before so more of the faithful may attend. The Matins Gospel read on this day is from the Gospel of Matthew Matthew 22:15-23:39.

The four Gospels are divided up and read in their entirety at the Little Hours (Third Hour, Sixth Hour and Ninth Hour) during the course of the first three days of Holy Week, halting at John 13:31. There are various methods of dividing the Gospels, but the following is the most common practice:

- Third Hour—The second half of Mark
- Sixth Hour—The first third of Luke
- Ninth Hour—The second third of Luke

At the Sixth Hour, there is a reading from the Book of Ezekiel Ezekiel 1:21-2:1.

At the Liturgy of the Presanctified Gifts, some of the stichera from the previous night's Matins (Lauds and the Aposticha) are repeated at Lord, I have cried (see Vespers). There are two Old Testament readings: Exodus 2:5-10 and Job 1:13-22. There is no Epistle reading, but there is a Gospel reading from Matthew 24:36-26:2.
