= Orthros =

Eastern Christian church service

Orthros (Greek: ὄρθρος, meaning "early dawn" or "daybreak") or útrenya (Slavonic ѹ́тренѧ) in the Byzantine Rite of the Eastern Orthodox Church and the Eastern Catholic Churches, is the last of the four night offices (church services), the other three being vespers, compline, and midnight office. Traditionally, in monasteries it is held daily so as to end immediately following sunrise, in contrast to parishes where it is held only on Sundays and feast days. It is often called matins after the office it most nearly corresponds to in Western Christian churches.

Orthros is the longest and most complex of the daily cycle of services. It is normally held in the early morning, often — always in monasteries — preceded by the midnight office, and usually followed by the First Hour. On great feasts it is held as part of an all-night vigil commencing the evening before, combined with an augmented great vespers and the first hour. In the Russian tradition, an all-night vigil is celebrated every Saturday evening, typically abridged, however, in spite of its name, to as short as two hours. In the Greek parish tradition, orthros is typically held immediately prior to the beginning of the divine liturgy on Sunday and feast day mornings.

The akolouth (fixed portion of the service) is composed primarily of psalms and litanies. The sequences (variable parts) of matins are composed primarily of hymns and canons from the octoechos (an eight-tone cycle of hymns for each day of the week, covering eight weeks), and from the menaion (hymns for each calendar day of the year). During great lent and some of the period preceding it, some of the portions from the octoechos and menaion are replaced by hymns from the triodion and during the paschal season with material from the pentecostarion. On Sundays there is also a gospel reading and corresponding hymns from the eleven-part cycle of resurrectional gospels.

== Outline ==
All of the psalms used herein are numbered according to the Septuagint, which is the official version of the Old Testament used by the Byzantine Rite. To find the corresponding KJV numbering, see the article Kathisma.

- Matins usually opens with what is called the "Royal Beginning", so called because the psalms (19 and 20) speak of a king. The royal beginning is not used in Greek parish practice; also, it is omitted at all-night vigil (during Paschal season it is replaced by the paschal troparion sung thrice):
  - The priest's opening blessing: Blessed is our God ..., reader: Amen. and the usual beginning.
  - Psalms 19 and 20, during which the priest performs a full censing of the temple (church building and worshippers).
  - Glory... Both now... and the Trisagion prayers.
  - The Royal troparia:
  - A brief litany by the priest (not the deacon as is usual for litanies)
  - Ekphonesis by the priest: Glory to the holy, consubstantial, life-giving and undivided trinity, always, now and ever, and unto the ages of ages
- The Six Psalms (3, 37, 62, 87, 102, and 142), (Note: One of the oldest elements in the orthros service and according to a pious tradition said to recall the Last Judgement, as Psalm 103 at vespers recalls the creation.) during which the priest says twelve silent prayers: six in front of the Holy Table (altar), and six in front of the Holy Doors. The monastic typikon orders the priest to read them in front of the closed altar doors.
  - The Six Psalms (Greek: Ἑξάψαλμος, Hexapsalmos) were originally associated with the Midnight Office, whose theme was primarily on the Second Coming and the Final Judgement. For this reason, there is traditionally no movement in the church including no reverencing of icons or making the sign of the cross.
- The Litany of Peace
- God, the Lord... and the apolytikion (troparion of the day)
  - Verses from Psalm 117 are interspersed between each chanting of God, the Lord, has appeared to you, blessed is he who comes in the name of the Lord. (Greek: Θεός, Κύριος και επέφανεν υμίν, ευλογημένος ο ερχόμενος εν ονόματι Κυρίου). These are Psalm 117:1, 117:10 & 117:23.
  - Many traditions recite Psalm 105:1 as the first verse. This is the result of a scribal error due to the similarities of that verse with the original verse quoting Psalm 117:1.
- The Psalter (either two or three sections, depending upon the liturgical season). For each section the following order is followed:
  - The kathisma (section from the Psalter)
  - The Little Litany
  - Feast Days: If a third section of Psalter readings is appointed, it may consist of the Polyeleos (many mercies), or other Psalms as outlined below.
    - Feasts of the Lord: The Polyeleos, consisting of Psalms 134 & 135 is chanted.
    - Feasts of the Mother of God: Psalm 44 is chanted.
    - Meatfare Sunday & Cheesefare Sunday: Psalm 136 is chanted.
    - Eklogarion: Depending on the feast day, additional Psalm readings might be chanted.
  - The sessional hymns (Greek: kathismata, Slavonic: sedalen)
- On Sundays: Evlogetaria (Blessed are you, O Lord, teach me your statutes)
- On Saturday of Souls: Evlogetaria for the dead
- The Little Litany
- On Sundays and Feast Days:
  - The Hypakoë is chanted to prepare for the message of the Gospel reading
  - The Anavathmoi ("hymns of ascent") based on Psalms 119-133, called the Song of Degrees)
  - The Prokeimenon
  - On Sundays, and every day during Paschal season: Choir: Having beheld the Resurrection of Christ ...
- The Matins Gospel: On Sundays, before the 50th psalm (Ν'), the priest reads one of the eight readings from the gospels, depending on the voice that psaltes are performing. After that, the holy gospel is worshiped by the faithful.
- Psalm 50 (Plain-read in Slavic traditions; Chanted in Greek traditions)
  - Pentecostarion (not to be confused with the Liturgical Book deriving its name from the 50 days after Easter):
    - Sundays and Feast Days: Glory ..., followed by an Idiomelon... then both now ... followed by a Theotokion... Have mercy on me... followed by a final festal Idiomelon.
    - Sundays, Feast Days and Lenten Days, the petition: O God, save your people and bless your inheritance ..."
- The canon:
  - First and Third Odes (Second Ode is always skipped except during certain Lenten services)
  - Little Litany
  - Sessional hymns
  - Fourth through Sixth Odes
  - Little Litany
  - Kontakion and oikos
  - Synaxarion (commemorating the saints of the day)
  - Seventh and Eighth Odes or in cities, katavasies
  - Ninth Ode, on most days preceded by the Magnificat, during which the deacon censes the church
- Little Litany
  - On Sundays, Holy is the Lord our God, three times (Greek: Άγιος Κύριος ο Θεός Υμών).
  - The exapostilaria (hymns related to the day's gospel, or the day's feast; the name is derived from Psalm 42:3 which was originally chanted at this point)
- The Lauds (Greek: Αἶνοι, Ainoi, "Praises"): Psalms 148, 149, 150; stichera are interspersed between the final verses on days the great doxology is sung,
- The ending:
- The doxastikon (the glory hymn), when chanted properly in Byzantine music is the longest, and usually the richest, hymn of the service. This is sometimes followed by another doxastikon or theotokion. On Sundays it is almost always the Theotokion: "You are Supremely Blessed...". (Greek: Υπερευλογημένη, Υπάρχεις Θεοτόκε, Παρθένε...)
- Doxology
  - Sundays and feast days: the Great Doxology is chanted. If a liturgy is followed, the rest of orthros is read secretly by priests during the doxastikon and orthros finishes here.
  - Weekdays: the Small Doxology is read, followed by the first litany, the aposticha, It is good to give praise unto the Lord..., (Greek: Αγαθόν το εξομολογείσθαι τω Κυρίω), the trisagion sequence followed by the apolytikion, and the second litany (there is no dismissal)
- The First Hour

In very traditional monasteries, readings from the Church Fathers are read after each of the sessional hymns.

== Types of Orthros ==
There are seven types of Matins:

=== Basic forms ===
- Sunday orthros—The longest of the regular orthros services - Gospel Reading and Great Doxology. If this service is celebrated in its entirety it can last up to six hours but is typically abridged.
- Daily orthros—Celebrated on most weekdays - No gospel reading, Small Doxology.
- Feast-day orthros—Very similar to Sunday orthros, excluding those parts which are strictly resurrectional in nature - gospel reading and Great Doxology.

=== Special forms ===
- Lenten orthros—Weekdays during great lent, the Wednesday and Friday of Cheesefare Week, and, optionally when there is no divine liturgy, on the weekdays of the lesser fasting seasons (Nativity Fast, Apostles' Fast and Dormition Fast). The service follows the order of daily orthros but with penitential material added (hymns and prayers), most days have three kathismata from the Psalter, "God is the Lord" is replaced by "Lenten Alleluia" (from which fact these days are identified as "days with Alleluia"). The petition: "O God, save your people and bless your inheritance ..." is read by the priest. There is no gospel reading. The Small Doxology is read and there is special lenten ending of the service, including the Prayer of St. Ephraim.
- Great and Holy Friday Orthros — Twelve Passion Gospels are interspersed throughout the service; Antiphons are used between the Gospels (these originated in a different office).
- Great and Holy Saturday Orthros—Lamentations are chanted around the epitaphios, interspersed between the verses of Psalm 118. Contains some elements of the old cathedral office: reading of three pericopes (lessons from the Old Testament, epistle and Gospel) at the end - Great Doxology followed by the procession with epitaphios.
- Paschal orthros—Celebrated during Bright Week, from the Sunday of Pascha (Easter) through Bright Saturday. The service is vastly different from the rest of the year; only the litanies, canon (the canticles of which are omitted) and lauds are the same; everything else, including the psalms, are replaced by special paschal hymns. The priest vests fully in his eucharistic vestments throughout the week. There is no doxology at all.

== See also ==
- Liturgy of the Hours
- Canonical hours
- Diurnum
- Compline
- Matins
- Vigil (liturgy)
- Anglican Morning Prayers
- Book of Hours
- Matins in Lutheranism
