= Holy Monday =

Day in Holy Week

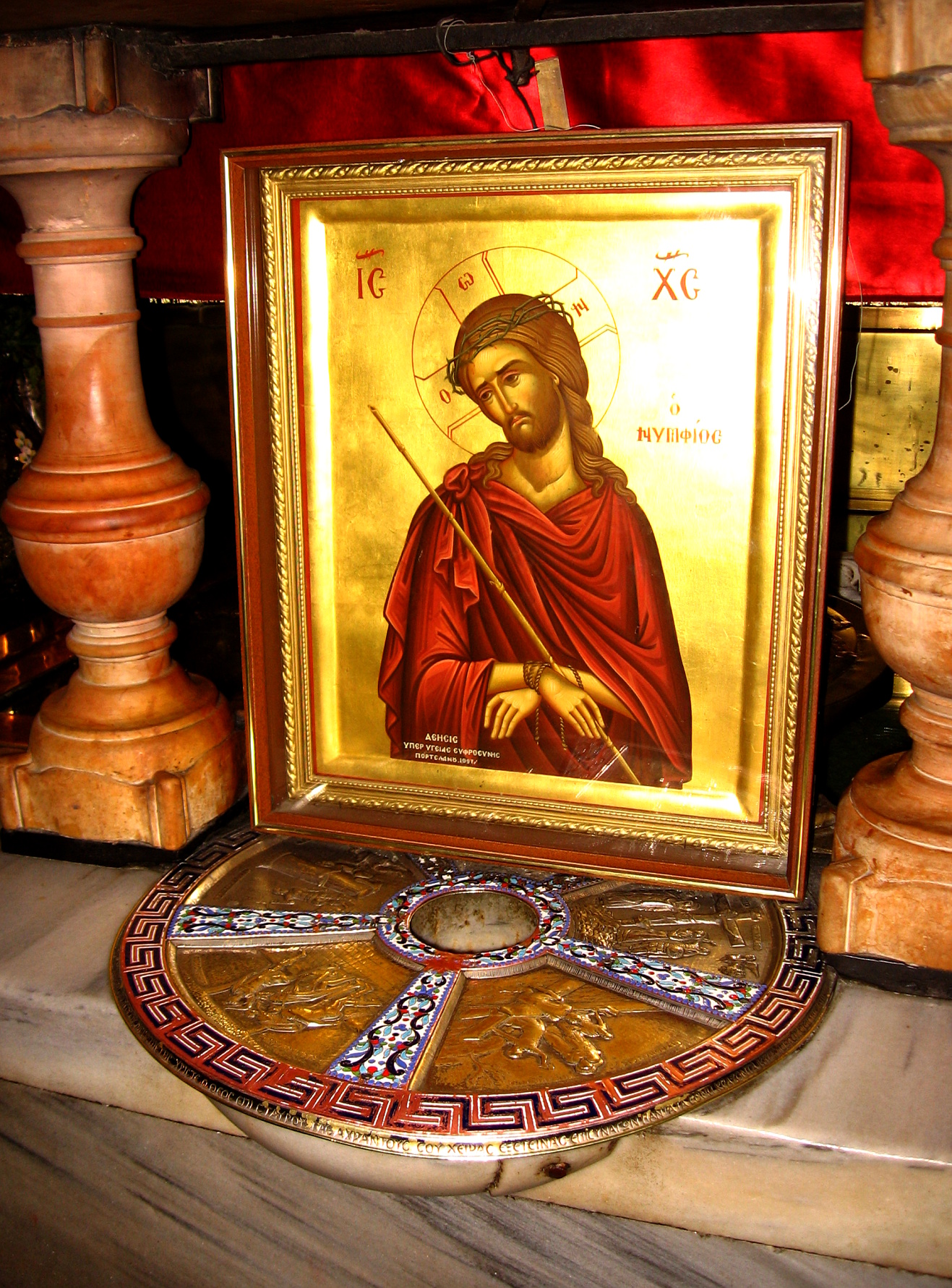
- An icon of Christ the Bridegroom, sitting above the star at Golgotha in the Church of the Holy Sepulchre, Jerusalem
- Also called: Great and Holy Monday
- Observed by: Christians
- Type: Christian
- Observances: Mass
- Date: Monday before Easter
- 2025 date: April 14 (Western); April 14 (Eastern)
- 2026 date: March 30 (Western); April 6 (Eastern)
- 2027 date: March 22 (Western); April 26 (Eastern)
- 2028 date: April 10 (Western); April 10 (Eastern)
- Frequency: annual
- Related to: Holy Week

Holy Monday or Great and Holy Monday (also Holy and Great Monday) (Greek: Μεγάλη Δευτέρα / Αγία και Μεγάλη Δευτέρα, romanized: Megáli Deftéra / Agía kai Megáli Deftéra; Hebrew: יום שני הקדוש, romanized: Yum Shani Hakdush) is a day of the Holy Week, which is the week before Easter. According to the gospels, on this day Jesus Christ cursed the fig tree (Matthew 21:18–22, Mark 11:20–26), cleansed the temple, and responded to the questioning of his authority (Matthew 21:23–27).

It is the third day of Holy Week in Eastern Christianity, after Lazarus Saturday and Palm Sunday, and the second day of Holy Week in Western Christianity, after Palm Sunday.

== Biblical narrative ==
The Gospels tell some of the events that occurred on the day of the Biblical Holy Monday. Some of the most notable and recognizable of these were the cursing of the fig tree (Matthew 21:18–22, Mark 11:20–26), the questioning of Jesus' authority (Matthew 21:23–27), the Cleansing of the Temple and some diverse parables, depending on which Gospel is read.

== Western Christianity ==
Holy Monday and other named days and day ranges around Lent and Easter in Western Christianity, with the fasting days of Lent numbered

In the Roman Catholic Church, the Gospel lesson at Mass is John 12:1–9, which chronologically occurred before the Entry into Jerusalem described in John 12:12–19. Other readings used are Isaiah 42:1–7 and Psalm 27:1-3, 13-14.

In the Revised Common Lectionary, which is used by the Anglican Communion, Methodist Churches, Lutheran Churches, Old Catholic Churches and Reformed Churches, the Scripture lessons are Isaiah 42:1–9 (First Reading), 36:5–11 (Psalm), Hebrews 9:11–15 (Second Reading), and John 12:1–9, (Gospel Reading).

In traditional Methodist usage, The Book of Worship for Church and Home (1965) provides the following Collect for Holy Monday:

Grant, we beseech thee, almighty God, that we, who are in so many occasions of adversity, by reason of or frailty are found wanting, may yet, through the passion and intercession of thine only begotten Son, be continually refreshed; who liveth and reigneth with thee, in the unity of the Holy Spirit, world without end. Amen.

== Eastern Christianity ==
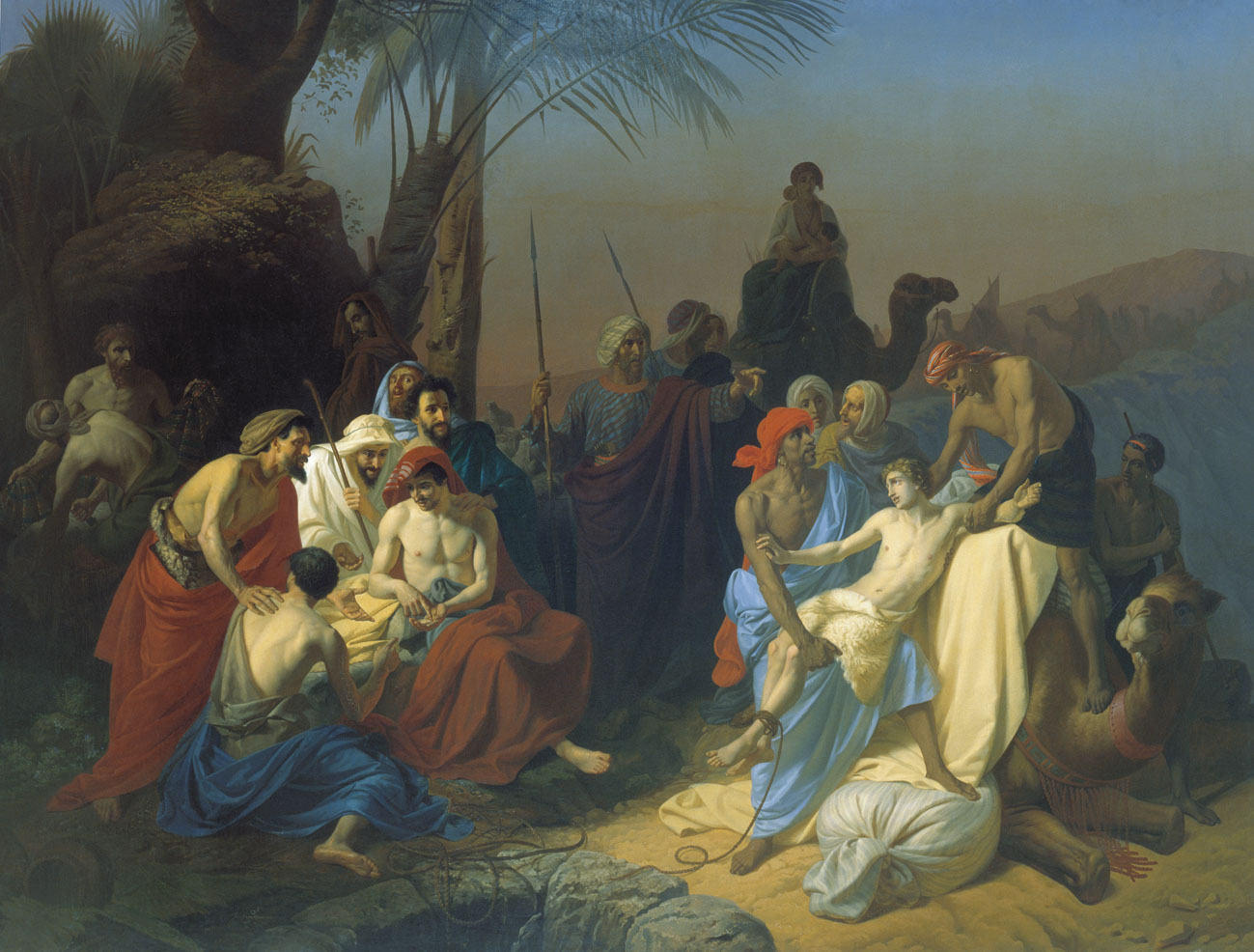
Joseph sold into slavery by his brothers (Konstantin Flavitsky, 1855).

In the Eastern Orthodox Church and those Eastern Catholic Churches that follow the Byzantine Rite, this day is referred to as Great and Holy Monday, or Great Monday. On this day the Church commemorates the withering of the fruitless fig tree (Matthew 21:18–22), a symbol of judgement that will befall those who do not bring forth the fruits of repentance. The hymns on this day also recall Joseph, the son of Jacob, whose innocent suffering at the hand of his brethren (Genesis 37), and false accusation (Genesis 39-40) are a type (foreshadowing) of the Passion of Christ.

The day begins liturgically with Vespers on Palm Sunday night, repeating some of the same stichera (hymns) from the Praises of the All Night Vigil the evening before. At Small Compline a Triode (Canon composed of three Odes), written by St. Andrew of Crete is chanted.

The Matins service for Monday through Wednesday of Holy Week is known as the Bridegroom Service or Bridegroom Prayer in the Greek Orthodox Church, because of their theme of Christ as the Bridegroom of the Church, a theme expressed in the troparion that is solemnly chanted near the beginning of the service.

On these days, an icon of "Christ the Bridegroom" is placed on an analogion in the center of the temple, portraying Jesus wearing the purple robe of mockery and crowned with a crown of thorns (see Instruments of the Passion). The Matins Gospel read on this day is from the Gospel of Matthew 21:18–43). The canon at Matins has only three odes in it (a triode), and was composed by St. Cosmas of Maiuma.

The four Gospels are divided and read in their entirety at the Little Hours (Third Hour, Sixth Hour and Ninth Hour) during the course of the first three days of Holy Week, halting at John 13:31. There are various methods of dividing the Gospels, but the most common is:

Holy and Great Monday

- Third Hour—The first half of Matthew
- Sixth Hour—The second half of Matthew
- Ninth Hour—The first half of Mark

At the Sixth Hour there is a reading from the Book of Ezekiel 1:1–20

At the Liturgy of the Presanctified Gifts, some of the stichera from the previous night's Matins (Lauds and the Aposticha) are repeated at Lord, I have cried (see Vespers). There are two Old Testament readings: Exodus 1:1–20 and Job 1:1–12. There is no Epistle reading, but there is a Gospel reading from Matthew 24:3–35.
