= The Christian Centuries =

BBC Radio Four Series

The Christian Centuries was a BBC Radio Four series presented by Brian Redhead. The series traced developments over the course of centuries centring round certain charismatic personalities.

In an obituary note, written by Tam Dalyell for The Independent, Dalyell said that he had told Redhead he thought the radio series the best thing Redhead had done, and that he had agreed and wanted to pursue more such material.

A book of the series by Brian Redhead and Frances Gumley was published in 1989 by BBC Books. The 12 personalities featured were;

- Constantine the Great
- Jerome
- Leo I
- Benedict of Nursia
- Hilda of Whitby
- Charlemagne
- Kassia
- Vladimir, Prince of Kiev
- Pope Urban II
- Hildegard of Bingen
- Francis of Assisi
- Dante Alighieri
