= Lectionary 92 =

Lectionary ℓ 92
- New Testament manuscript
- Text: Apostolos
- Date: 14th-century
- Script: Greek
- Now at: Bibliothèque nationale de France
- Size: 22 cm by 14.7 cm

Lectionary 92, designated by siglum ℓ 92 (in the Gregory-Aland numbering). It is a Greek manuscript of the New Testament, on cotton paper leaves. Palaeographically it has been assigned to the 14th-century.

== Description ==
The codex contains lessons from the Acts of the Apostles, Catholic epistles, and Pauline epistles lectionary (Apostolos) with some lacunae. It is written in Greek minuscule letters, on 212 paper leaves (22 cm by 14.7 cm). The writing stands in 1 column per page, 21 lines per page.

It contains Menologion and fragments of the Liturgy of St. Basil, Chrysostom, and Praesanctified.

== History ==
The manuscript was partially examined by Scholz. It was examined and described by Paulin Martin. C. R. Gregory saw it in 1885.

The manuscript is not cited in the critical editions of the Greek New Testament (UBS3).

Currently the codex is located in the Bibliothèque nationale de France (Gr. 324) in Paris.

== See also ==
- List of New Testament lectionaries
- Biblical manuscript
- Textual criticism
