= Matins Gospel =

Chanting from the Gospels at Matins

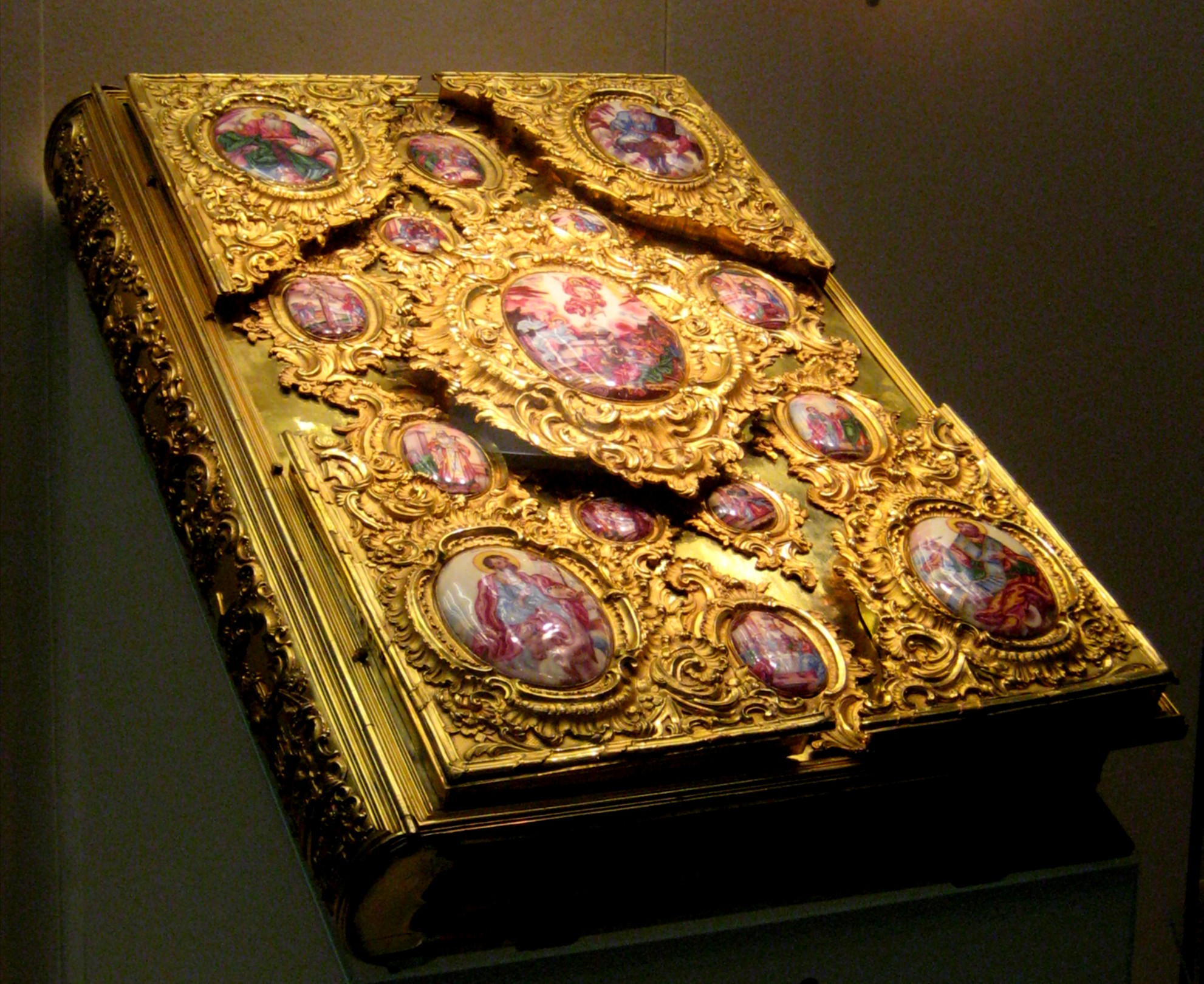
Gospel Book from 1772. The central medallion depicts the Resurrection of Jesus, in the corners are the Four Evangelists (Moscow)

The Matins Gospel is the solemn chanting of a lection from one of the Four Gospels during Matins in the Orthodox Church and those Eastern Catholic churches which follow the Byzantine Rite.

The reading of the Gospel is the highpoint of the service, and takes place near the end of the festive portion of the service known as the Polyeleos. During the Divine Liturgy the Gospel is usually read by the deacon, but the Matins Gospel is read by the priest. However, if the bishop is present, he will usually be the one who reads the Matins Gospel.

== Sunday ==
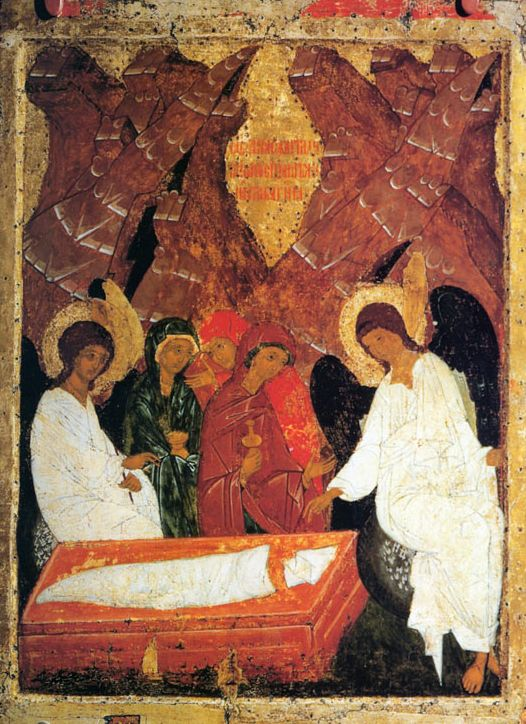
Icon used on the Sunday of the Myrrhbearers, illustrating one of the Resurrection appearances of Jesus. The two Marys are in the center with the two angels at either side, in the foreground is the Holy Sepulchre with the winding sheet and napkin.

Every Sunday is a commemoration of the Resurrection of Jesus, and so it is always observed as a feast (in the Slavic churches it is customary to serve an All-Night Vigil every Saturday night).

The Sunday Matins Gospels (known as the "Matins Resurrection Gospels") are an eleven-week cycle of readings taken from the Gospel accounts of the Resurrection appearances of Jesus.

The Sunday Matins Gospels are:

1. Matthew 28:16–20
2. Mark 16:1–8
3. Mark 16:9–20
4. Luke 24:1–12
5. Luke 24:12–35
6. Luke 24:36–53
7. John 20:1–10
8. John 20:11–18
9. John 20:19–31
10. John 21:1–14
11. John 21:15–25

The cycle begins on the Sunday after Pentecost, and continues up to, but not including, Palm Sunday of the succeeding year. The eleven lessons are read in order and without interruption, except on Great Feasts of the Lord—which have their own Matins Gospels—until Pascha (Easter) of the following year. During the Pentecostarion (the period from Pascha until Pentecost), the same Gospels are read at Sunday Matins, but not in the same order.

The Gospel reading is preceded by a prokeimenon, a selection from the Psalms relevant to the theme of the resurrection. These prokeimena are chanted according to an eight-week cycle known as the Octoechos, and are chanted in a different liturgical mode each week of the cycle. The deacon then leads the choir in chanting, "Let every breath praise the Lord", which is chanted in the same mode as the prokeimenon.

On Sundays, the Matins Gospel is read at the Holy Table (altar), which symbolizes the Tomb of Christ. The priest does not hold the Gospel Book during the reading, but reads it as it lies open on the Holy Table. Immediately after the reading, the priest kisses the Gospel Book and hands it to the deacon who brings it out through the Holy Doors and stands on the ambon, holding the Gospel aloft for all to see, while the choir chants the following Hymn of the Resurrection:

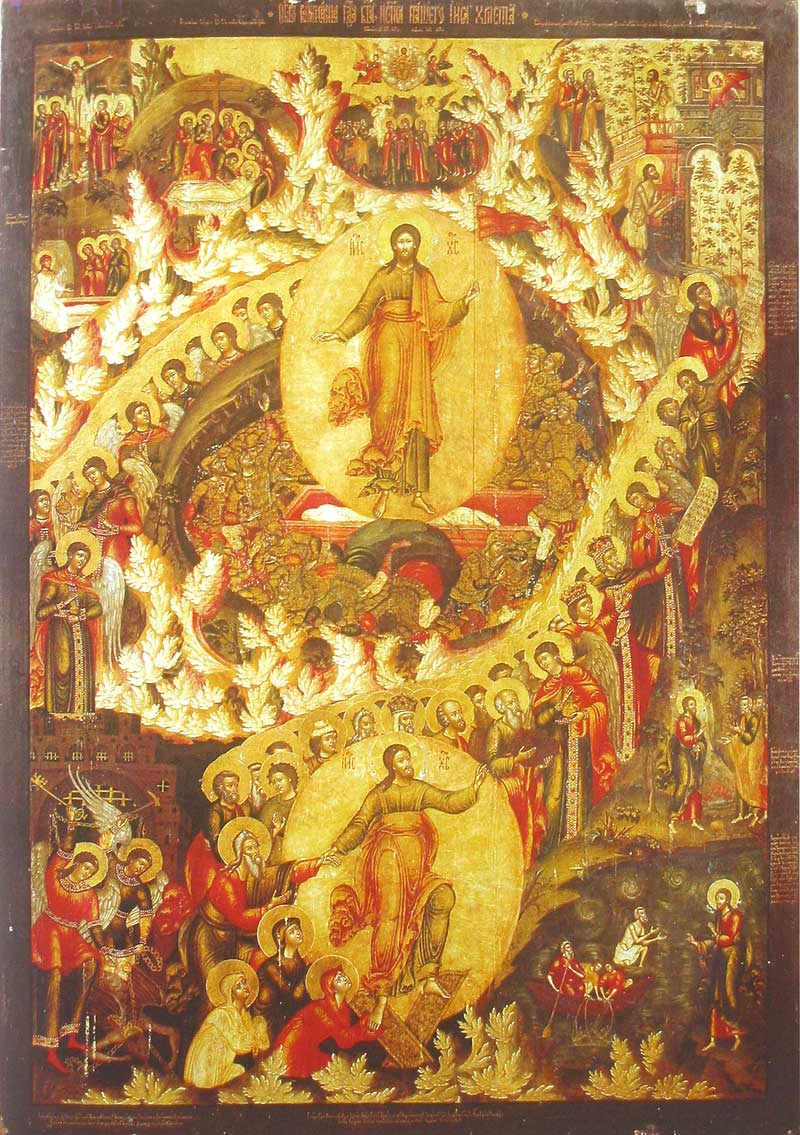
Icon illustrating the Resurrection appearances of Jesus which are mentioned in the 11 Matins Resurrection Gospels (1600s, Yaroslavl School).

Having beheld the Resurrection of Christ, let us worship the holy Lord Jesus, the only sinless one. We venerate Thy cross, O Christ, and Thy holy Resurrection we praise and glorify. For Thou art our God, and we know none other than Thee. We call on Thy name. O come, all ye faithful, let us venerate Christ's holy Resurrection. For behold, through the cross joy hath come into all the world. Ever blessing the Lord, we praise his Resurrection: for by enduring the cross, he hath slain death by death.

During the Paschal season this hymn is chanted three times.

The Gospel Book is then brought into center of nave and placed on an analogion to be venerated by the faithful. The reason for this is that the Orthodox consider the Gospel Book to be an icon of Christ. The deacon holding the Gospel, and the priest following him, symbolize the angels announcing the resurrection to the Myrrhbearers; the bringing forth of the Gospel Book into the center of the temple symbolizes Jesus' appearances to the disciples after his resurrection; and in venerating the Gospel Book the faithful are greeting the resurrected Christ, as the Apostles did (Matthew 28:9, John 20:19–20).

Later in the Matins service, there are two sets of hymns which are chanted in accordance with the Matins Resurrection Gospel that was read that week. One is the Exapostilarion, which is chanted at the end of the canon, and the other is a sticheron called the Eothinon (εωθινόν) which is chanted at the end of Lauds. The Eothinion is chanted to its own special melody, known as an idiomelon. Both of these sets of hymns are traditionally attributed to the Emperor Constantine VII Porphyrogenitus.

If a Great Feast of the Lord ( Transfiguration, Theophany, etc.) falls on a Sunday, the normal Sunday Resurrection service, including its Matins Gospel, is replaced entirely by the service for the feast. If a Great Feast of the Theotokos (Mother of God) falls on a Sunday, it is combined with the normal Sunday service, but the Matins Gospel read is the one for the Theotokos. If the feast day of a saint falls on Sunday, it is combined with the normal Sunday service, but the Matins Gospel read is for the Sunday.

== Feast Days ==
Matins Gospels are also read on the Great Feasts of the Orthodox Church and on the more solemn feast days of saints (i.e., days with Polyeleos or All-Night Vigil--weekdays on which lower-ranking saints are commemorated do not have a Matins Gospel). The Matins Gospels on feast days are different from the ones read on Sundays, and are selected for the specific occasion being commemorated. The Matins Gospel read on Great Feasts of the Theotokos is always Luke 1:39–49.

The prokeimenon which precedes the feast day Gospel is different from the Sunday prokeimena, and is relevant to the theme of the feast. It is almost invariably chanted in the Fourth liturgical mode, as is "Let every breath praise the Lord". On feast days, the Gospel is not read at the Holy Table, but is brought into the center to the nave by the deacon, who holds the Gospel Book while the priest chants the Matins Gospel in front of the icon of the feast being celebrated. Immediately after the reading, the Gospel Book is returned to its place on the Holy Table, and the faithful instead venerate the icon of the feast. "Having beheld the Resurrection of Christ" is not chanted, except during the Paschal season, when it is chanted once on weekdays, regardless of the rank of the feast. On feast days, after the faithful have venerated the icon of the feast, they are anointed (myrovania) on the forehead with blessed oil.

The Exapostilarion and Lauds Sticheron on feast days are also relevant to the theme of the feast, and have been composed by different hymnographers.

== Holy Week ==
On each day of Holy Week there is a reading of the Gospel at Matins, covering the theme of that day:

- Great and Holy Monday: Matthew 21:18–43—The Withering of the Fig Tree, Parable of the Two Sons (Parables of Jesus)
- Great and Holy Tuesday: Matthew 22:15–23:39—Woes of the Pharisees, Eschatology, Jesus' mourning for Jerusalem
- Great and Holy Wednesday: John 12:17–50—Virtues of Martyrdom, Jesus foretells his death
- Great and Holy Thursday: Luke 22:1–39—The Last Supper

On Great and Holy Friday there are Twelve Matins Gospels recounting the Passion from the Last Supper to the sealing of the tomb, interspersed throughout the Matins service. During the reading of each of these twelve Gospels, the faithful stand holding lighted candles.

On Great and Holy Saturday the Matins Gospel (Matthew 27:62–66 - The Jews set a guard) is not read in its normal place, but is read near the end of the service before the litanies and Dismissal.
