= Doxastikon =

Type of hymn in the Eastern Orthodox Church

A Doxastikon (Greek: Δοξαστικόν "Glory sticheron")—plural: doxastika— is a type of hymn found in the Divine Services of the Eastern Orthodox Church and those Eastern Catholic Churches which follow the Byzantine Rite.

Specifically, a doxastikon is a sticheron which is chanted after or between:

- Δόξα

Δόξα Πατρὶ καὶ Υἱῷ καὶ Ἁγίῳ Πνεύματι·

"Glory to the Father, and to the Son, and to the Holy Spirit."

and

- Καὶ νῦν

καὶ νῦν καὶ ἀεὶ καὶ εἰς τοὺς αἰῶνας τῶν αἰώνων. Ἀμήν.

"Both now and ever and unto the ages of ages. Amen."

== Position in services ==
Doxastika are normally found near the end of a series of stichera. Doxastika may be found at Vespers Κύριε, ἐκέκραξα πρὸς σέ ("Lord, I Have Cried", Ps. 140.1 and the Aposticha), at Matins (Kathisma hymns, Aposticha, Lauds), and at the Divine Liturgy (the Beatitudes).

There are other instances when a hymn is found between "Glory..." and "Both now..." (i.e., Apolytikion, the Canon); however, these hymns are troparia rather than stichera, and so are not referred to as doxasticha.

== Subject matter ==
The subject matter of the doxastikon can be either the glorification of the Trinity (in which case it is known as a Triadikon), or honouring the saint of the day. Feasts of the Theotokos (Virgin Mary) often do not have doxastika, since she is honoured during the Theotokion, which is the sticheron which follows "Both now and ever...". Feasts of the Lord will often have neither a Doxastikon nor a Theotokion, the latter being replaced by a verse in honor of the feast. Lower-ranking feasts of saints do not usually have doxastika, though some do.

Doxastika are always intended to be chanted in one of the eight liturgical modes, or a variation on the modes, known as an automelon.

== See also ==
- Hymnology
- Canonical hours
- Halim El-Dabh Doxastiko (or Theodora in Byzantium)
