= Jesus' authority questioned =

Gospel episode

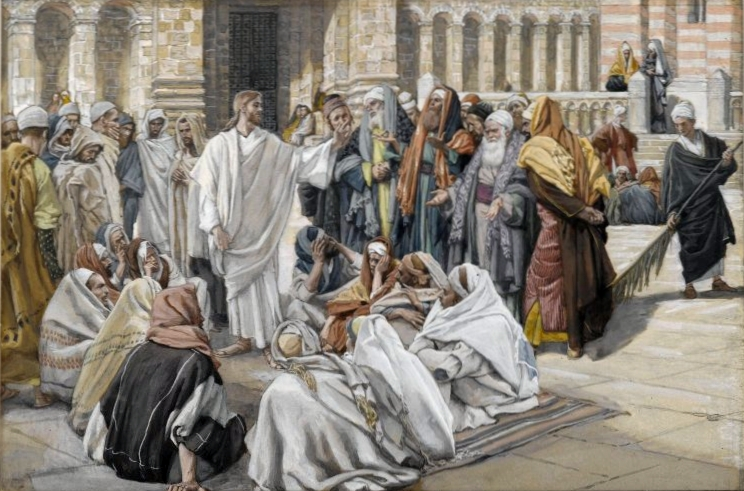
James Tissot - The Pharisees Question Jesus (Les pharisiens questionnent Jésus) - Brooklyn Museum

The authority of Jesus is questioned whilst he is teaching in the Temple in Jerusalem, as reported in all three synoptic gospels: Matthew 21:23–27, Mark 11:27–33 and Luke 20:1–8.

According to the Gospel of Matthew:

Jesus entered the temple courts, and, while he was teaching, the chief priests and the elders of the people came to him. "By what authority are you doing these things?" they asked. "And who gave you this authority?"

Jesus replied, "I will also ask you one question. If you answer me, I will tell you by what authority I am doing these things. John's baptism — where did it come from? Was it from heaven, or of human origin?"

They discussed it among themselves and said, "If we say, 'From heaven', he will ask, 'Then why didn’t you believe him?' But if we say, 'Of human origin' - we are afraid of the people, for they all hold that John was a prophet". So they answered Jesus, "We don’t know".

Then he said, "Neither will I tell you by what authority I am doing these things".

In all three synoptic gospels, this episode takes place shortly after the cleansing of the Temple reported after Jesus' triumphal entry into the city. The word "authority" (Greek: ἐξουσίᾳ, exousia) is frequently used in relation to Jesus in the New Testament.

A similar episode is described in the Gospel of John at John 2:13–18) as part of the Cleansing of the Temple narrative. In John's account, after expelling the merchants and the money changers from the Temple, Jesus is confronted:

Then the Jews said to Him, “What sign do You show us, seeing that You do these things?”

== See also ==
- Gospel harmony
