= Exapostilarion =

The Exapostilarion (Greek: ἐξαποστειλάριον, pl. ἐξαποστειλάρια Exapostilaria; Russian Ексапостила́рий) is a hymn or group of hymns chanted in the Eastern Orthodox and Greek-Catholic Churches at the conclusion of the Canon near the end of Matins. The Exapostilarion is chanted after the Little Litany that follows the Ninth Ode of the Canon.

== Overview ==
The term "exapostilarion" is related to the word Apostle, which itself is derived from a Greek word meaning “sent out.” It has this name because in ancient times a chanter was sent out from the choir into the center of the church to chant this hymn. The exapostilaria ask God to enlighten the minds of the faithful that they might worthily praise the Lord in the verses of the Lauds which follow, and in the Great Doxology.

At simple services on weekdays, especially during Great Lent, the normal exapostilaria are replaced with the Photagogicon (Greek: Φωταγωγικόν pl. Φωταγωγικά Photagogica; Slavonic: Светиленъ Svetilen, pl. Светилны, Svyetilniy), "Hymn of Light." The Lenten form of the photagogica are chanted in the Tone of the Week, are of a penitential nature, and are similar in performance to the Triadica (Hymns to the Trinity) that were sung near the beginning of Matins.

On Sundays, just before the exapostilarion the canonarch (or, the deacon in Russian practice) recites the verses for the singing of “Holy is the Lord our God” three times. On Sundays, the theme of the Exapostilarion reflects the concept of the Myrrh-bearing Women being sent to bring the Good News (Gospel) of the Resurrection of Christ to the Apostles, and is drawn from the Resurrection Gospel that was chanted before the Canon.

During Holy Week the Exapostilarion is of great significance and is solemnly chanted in the center of the church by three singers (or by the entire choir). The Matins service on most of the Days of Holy Week is referred to as the "Bridegroom Prayer," after the theme of the Exapostilarion for those days: "I see Thy bridal chamber adorned..." (a reference to the Tomb of Christ).

At Pascha (Easter) the Exapostilarion is chanted first by the clergy and then repeated twice by the choir to a particularly joyful melody.

The Exapostilarion of Pascha. Tone 2.
In the flesh Thou didst fall asleep as a mortal man, O King and Lord. Thou didst rise on the third day, raising Adam from corruption, and destroying death: O Pascha of incorruption, the Salvation of the world!
