= Liturgy of the Presanctified Gifts =

Byzantine Rite liturgical practice

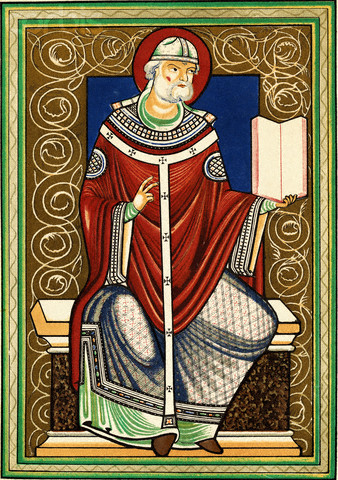
Saint Gregory Dialogus, who is credited with compiling the Divine Liturgy of the Presanctified Gifts

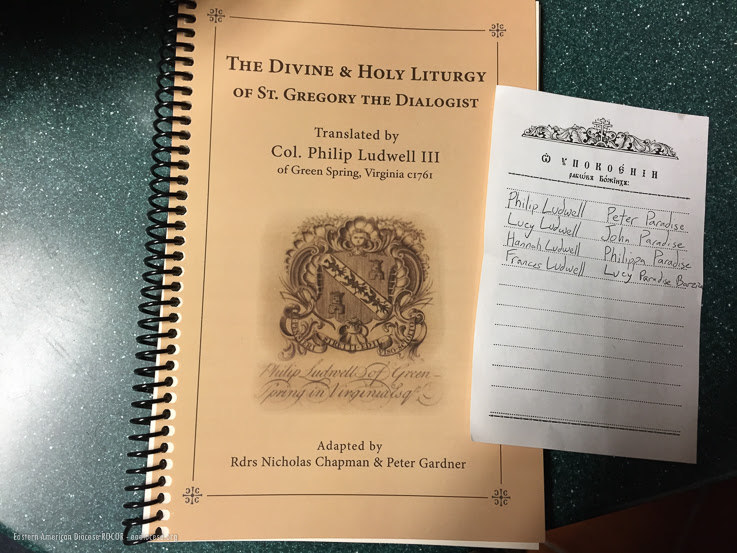
"The Divine and Holy Liturgy of St. Gregory the Dialogist translated by Col. Philip Ludwell III"

The Liturgy of the Presanctified Gifts (Greek: λειτουργία τών Προηγιασμένων Δώρων), also referred to as The Divine Liturgy of Saint Gregory the Dialogist, is a Byzantine Rite liturgical service which is performed on the weekdays of Great Lent and the first three days of Holy Week wherein communion is received from Gifts (the Body and Blood of Christ) that are sanctified (consecrated) in advance, hence its name; this Divine Liturgy has no anaphora (Eucharistic Prayer).

The Presanctified is used on the weekdays of Great Lent, a season of repentance, fasting, and intensified prayer when the more frequent reception of communion is desirable; however, the full Divine Liturgy having a joyful character is not in keeping with the somberness of the season of repentance (Eucharist literally means 'thanksgiving') and so the Presanctified is substituted. Although this service may be performed on any weekday (Monday through Friday) of Great Lent, common parish practice is to celebrate it only on Wednesdays, Fridays, and a feast day on which the polyeleos is sung that falls on a weekday. The Typicon also prescribes the Presanctified on the Thursday of the Great Canon (the fifth Thursday of Lent), and on first three days of Holy Week.

== Celebration ==
The following outline is in part extracted from the Liturgicon (priest's service book).

The Presanctified Liturgy, aside from having no anaphora (Eucharistic Prayer), is structured much like other vesperal divine liturgies that are prescribed for strict fast days. After the normal opening of the Liturgy of the Catechumens ("Blessed is the Kingdom ...") vespers proceeds normally until the kathisma, the three stasees (subdivisions) of which are treated as three antiphons with silent prayers of the antiphons analogous to those of the other Divine Liturgies. Normally this kathisma is the eighteenth, consisting of the Songs of Ascents, but different ones are appointed each day during the fifth week, to make up for the fact that only one will be sung at Matins on Thursday (when the Great Canon is sung).

If the consecrated Lamb is already on table of prothesis, the priest puts it on the diskos, pours wine and water in the chalice, covers and censes them. Otherwise, during the first antiphon the Lamb is placed on the diskos, which is covered and censed. During the second antiphon, the priest, preceded by a deacon with a lighted candle, processes round the holy table thrice, each time censing it in the form of a cross. During the third antiphon the priest prostrates before the gifts which he then places on his head and carries, preceded by the deacon with lighted candle and censer, to the prothesis table where he censes and covers the gifts and pours wine and water into the chalice which he likewise covers.

Following the kathisma, 'Lord, I call' is sung. Ordinarily, ten stichera are sung at a Liturgy of the Presanctified: one (repeated) being the idiomelon for the day, which would otherwise be sung at the aposticha, with its accompanying sticheron to the martyrs; three being stichera of the day from the Triodion (on the first four Fridays, these are further stichera to the martyrs in the tone of the week); and three (the first being repeated) being stichera of the feast from the Menaion, concluding with the theotokion (or, on the fifth Thursday, stavrotheotokion) from the Menaion or, on Fridays, the Octoechos. There are, however, variations on this: on the fifth Wednesday, thirty stichera are sung, the twenty-four penitential stichera taking the place of the ones from the Menaion; on the first, fifth and sixth Fridays all the stichera are from the Triodion; and during Holy Week they are taken from Matins the night before. Certain feasts in the Menaion also have special rules which change the composition of the stichera.

The Little Entrance follows, normally taking place with the censer, but with the Gospel if a Gospel reading is appointed later on (during Holy Week and on certain feasts in the Menaion). 'O Gladsome Light' is sung as usual. Following this, the evening Prokimenon (based on a cycle of the Psalms used through Lent and Holy Week) is sung, and the first reading is read, normally from the Book of Genesis but during Holy Week from the Book of Exodus, followed by another Prokimenon. The priest then emerges from the altar carrying a candle and censer, proclaiming, 'The Light of Christ illumines all,' while the congregation make a prostration. The second reading is then read, normally from the Book of Proverbs but during Holy Week from the Book of Job. Following this, the priest and choir enter into the dialogue 'Let my prayer arise', after which the Prayer of Saint Ephrem is said. If an Epistle and/or Gospel is appointed, it is read here.

A series of litanies is then said. These take their structure from the full liturgy: the Litany of Fervent Intercession, the Litany and Dismissal of the Catechumens, the Litanies of the Faithful. After the fourth Wednesday in Lent, however, another litany is inserted between the ones for the catechumens and the faithful: the litany and dismissal of those awaiting illumination. This is a litany which was historically used at all liturgies at this time, and is for those who have completed their catechism (thus ceasing to be catechumens) but must wait until Holy Saturday to be received into the church.

A different Cherubic Hymn to usual is used, and the Great Entrance takes place in a manner similar to that of the Divine Liturgy, except that the priest rather than the deacon carries the diskos, he holds it higher than the chalice, and the entrance is made in absolute silence, while everyone makes a full prostration. The Prayer of Saint Ephrem is then said once again. The Evening Litany is said, followed by the Lord's Prayer. The elevation takes place similarly to at a usual Liturgy.

When it comes time for Holy Communion, the clergy make their communion as normal, except that no words accompany their drinking from the chalice. Those portions of the reserved Lamb which will be used to give communion to the faithful are placed in unconsecrated wine in the chalice. Local opinion varies as to whether or not this unconsecrated wine must be thought of as the Blood of Christ (even if the bread was intincted). The only practical effect of this variety is that the celebrant (priest or deacon) who must consume all the undistributed communion at the end of the service might or might not partake of the chalice when he communes himself: if the wine that was poured into the chalice is not the Blood of Christ, he would need to consume all of the consecrated elements before drinking any of the wine because drinking unconsecrated wine breaks the Eucharistic fast.

Different hymns are sung before, during and after communion to usual, based largely on different verses from Psalm 33, but 'Let our mouth be filled with Thy praise...' is sung as usual. The Litany of Thanksgiving is said, and a unique ambon prayer ('O Master Almighty...') follows, a remnant of a time when each Liturgy and feast had its own ambon prayer. The dismissal follows, as usual at a liturgy, unless another service (such as the blessing of kolyva on the first Friday) take place beforehand.

=== Preparation ===
On the previous Sunday, additional Lambs (hosts) are prepared and consecrated, enough for all of the Presanctified Liturgies that will be celebrated in the coming week. The exact same ceremonies and actions accompany the preparation and consecration of the extra lambs, as the one which will be used that day at the Divine Liturgy. After the consecration, just before the communion of the clergy, the rubric calls for the consecrated Lamb to be intincted with the consecrated Blood of Christ; however, depending on local practice, this is sometimes not done. In either case, the consecrated Lambs are reserved, often in a special pyx used only for this purpose.

== History ==
The Liturgy of the Presanctified Gifts was first documented by Pope Gregory I (540–604), who had been the papal legate to Constantinople. This liturgy is also mentioned in canon 52 of the Quinisext Council of 692 AD:

On all days of the holy fast of Lent, except on the Sabbath [i.e., Saturday], the Lord's Day [Sunday], and the holy day of the Annunciation, the Liturgy of the Presanctified is to be served.

== Other liturgical traditions ==
Although the Liturgy of the Presanctified Gifts is associated primarily with the Eastern Orthodox Church and the Byzantine Catholics, it is known in other churches.

In the Good Friday liturgy of the Roman Rite, there is a similar rite that has been unofficially called the Mass of the Presanctified: the rite of Commemoration of the Lord's Passion. Because there is no consecration of the gifts in that liturgy, it is not a Mass, being instead reception of Holy Communion from the reserved sacrament which was consecrated at Mass on Holy Thursday.

The Liturgy of Presanctified Gifts is also practiced in the Malankara Rite of the Indian Orthodox Church, although its practice in the Liturgy of St. James from which it descended is widely extinct nowadays.

In the Anglican Communion, the Book of Common Prayer for the United States provides likewise for the consecration of the reserved sacrament on Maundy Thursday and its reception at the special liturgy of Good Friday. The Divine Liturgy of the Presanctified Gifts is also used at some occasions in the Assyrian Church of the East.
