= Idiomelon =

Type of hymn in Orthodox Christianity

Idiomelon (Medieval Greek: ἰδιόμελον from idio-, 'unique' and -melon, 'melody'; Church Slavonic: самогласенъ, samoglasen)—pl. idiomela—is a type of sticheron found in the liturgical books used in the Eastern Orthodox Church, the Eastern Catholic Churches which follow the Byzantine Rite, and many other Orthodox communities like Old Believers. Idiomela are unique compositions, while avtomela or aftomela—sing. automelon, avtomelon or aftomelon (Medieval Greek: αὐτόμελον, Church Slavonic: самоподобенъ, samopodoben)—were used to create other hymns by a composition over the avtomelon's melody and following the poetic meter provided by the musical rhythm. The genre composed over these avtomela was characterised as prosomoion or prosomeion (Medieval Greek: προσόμοιον 'similar to', Church Slavonic: подобенъ, podoben).

== Definition of idiomelon, avtomelon and prosomoion ==
The hymn category idiomelon can only be understood in comparison with avtomelon and prosomoia. Already in the older book Tropologion each melody of a certain hymn was classified by a modal signature of the Byzantine octoechos—the eight-mode system as it had developed in Constantinople, Damascus, Jerusalem, and in many other places.

=== The sticherarion as a collection of idiomela ===
Nikiforov Miney with Triodion in Serbian redaction (c. 1550) (MK-SKu Ms. 172)

An idiomelon is a melodic type of sticheron whose music was notated for the first time in the new books of the sticheraria during the Studites reform. The Greek term στιχηρὸν ἰδιόμελον (stichēron idiomelon) derives from ἴδιος ('own, special') and μέλον ('melody'). It was used to classify unique melodies composed exclusively for the text of one particular hymn. These idiomela were created in many different traditions, but one voluminous book called sticherarion collected and documented them all by the use of musical notation. Since there were so many traditions whose hymnographers composed within the octoechos, the solution was found by the invention of a new neume notation in order to write down the whole repertory in the sticherarion. Its books were the Menaion (Miney), Triodion (Postnaya Triod), Pentecostarion (Tsvetnaya Triod), and the Parakletike (Osmoglasnik). They documented a large repertoire, but only a small part of it made up a local monastic tradition and the latter also included many hymns which were not written in the books.

It was a heterogenous collection of hymns, mainly of unique compositions (stichera idiomela) which could be identified by their own idiomatic melodies. The later Slavonic translators of the Ohrid school (since 893) called the idiomela samoglasniy. There are other stichera called prosomoia (Sl. podobniy) which do not have their own melodies, but they used a limited number of well-known melodies—the so-called avtomela (Sl. samopodobniy).

=== Avtomela and prosomoia as categories of an oral transmission ===
According to this simple typological definition a prosomoion could be recognised because it had just a rubric with an incipit of the avtomelon text, while the echos or glas (musical mode) was indicated by a modal signature. It was enough because educated chanters knew the avtomela by heart. The hymnographers had already used the melody of the avtomelon to compose the stanza and its verses of the prosomoion, while a singer had to adapt accentuation patterns if the accent in a verse was moved to the neighbouring syllable (see the kontakion example). Hence, the prosomoia had been written in textbooks (the Octoechos mega or Parakletike, or later another book called Menaion), but sometimes the prosomoia had been also notated in the Octoechos part of certain notated Sticheraria. These notated prosomoia allow to study how the avtomela were adapted to the verses and accents of their prosomoia.

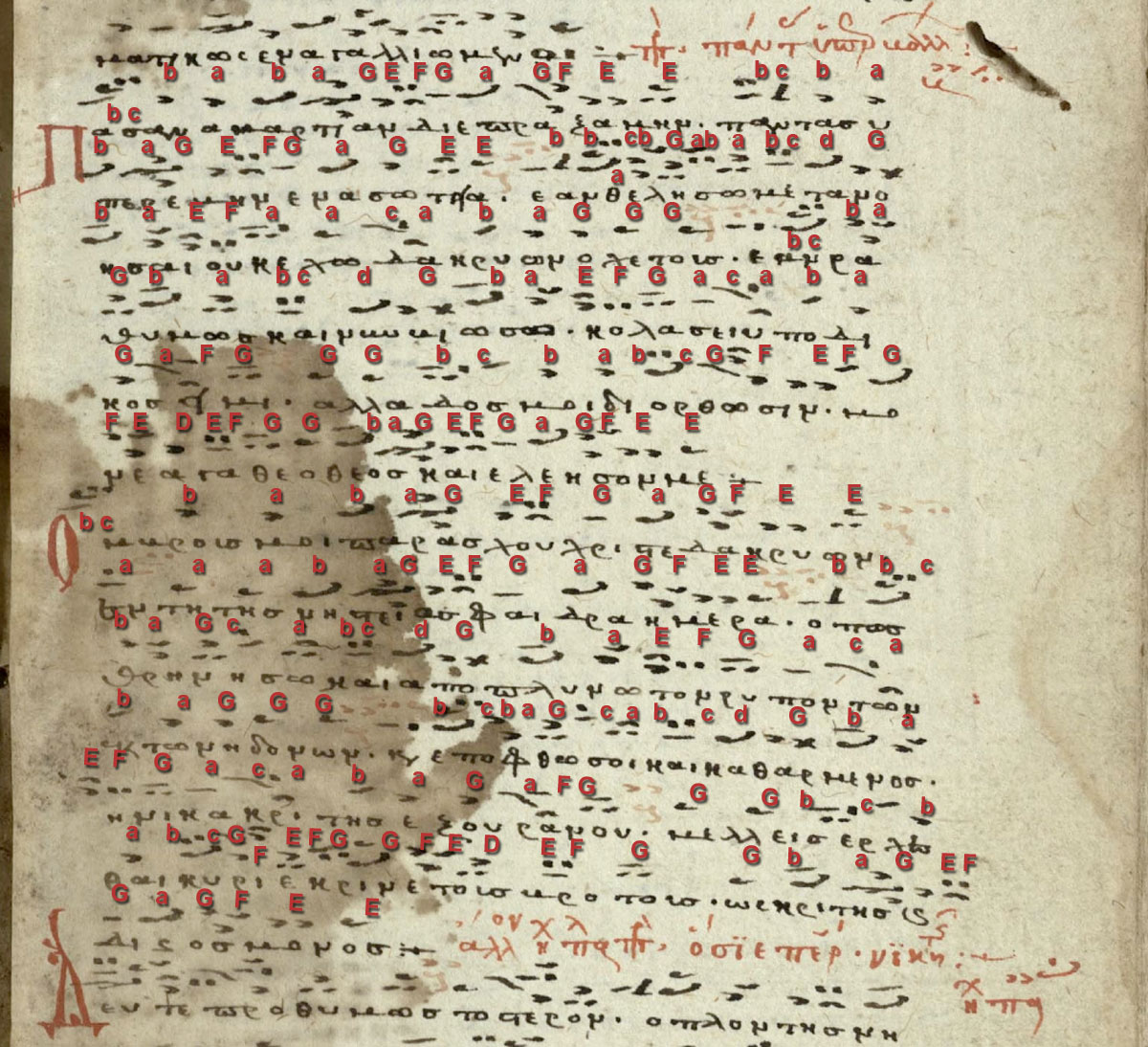
Avtomelon παντὰς ὑπερβάλλων (echos devteros) adapted to the verses of two Prosomoia—notated in an Octoechos of a 15th-century Sticherarion of the Pantokratorou monastery (GB-Ctc Ms. B.11.17, f. 283r)

The definition of αὐτόμελον (avtomelon) meant as well a sticheron which defines its melody—with a melody for "itself" (Gr. αὐτός, Sl. samopodoben), but not in the idiomatic and exclusive sense of the unique idiomela. Avtomelon simply meant that these hymns were regarded as a melodic model of their own, exemplified by the musical realisation of its poetic hymn. As such they also served for the composition of new verses, the prosomeia. The term στιχηρὸν προσόμοιον (stichēron prosomoion) means that this sticheron is "similar to" (Gr. προσόμιον, Sl. podoben) another sticheron. It was usually an avtomelon, but in some cases even idiomela had been used for a kind of contrafact and there are even cases of notated prosomoia because they had been mistaken for an avtomelon.

Certain more regular and formulaic avtomela of the octoechos had not been written down with notation before the 14th century or even later, since their hymns (apolytikia anastasima) had to be repeated every day. Today the Voskresnik or Anastasimatarion or an Orthros anthology also provides certain avtomela in neumes without any text, while the texts of the prosomoia, as far as they belong to the fixed cycle including the sanctoral, are in the Menaion which should not be confused with the notated chant book (the immoveable cycle of the Doxastarion, organised between the twelve months beginning with 1 September and concluding with 31 August, or the Slavonic Psaltikiyna Mineynik).

== History ==
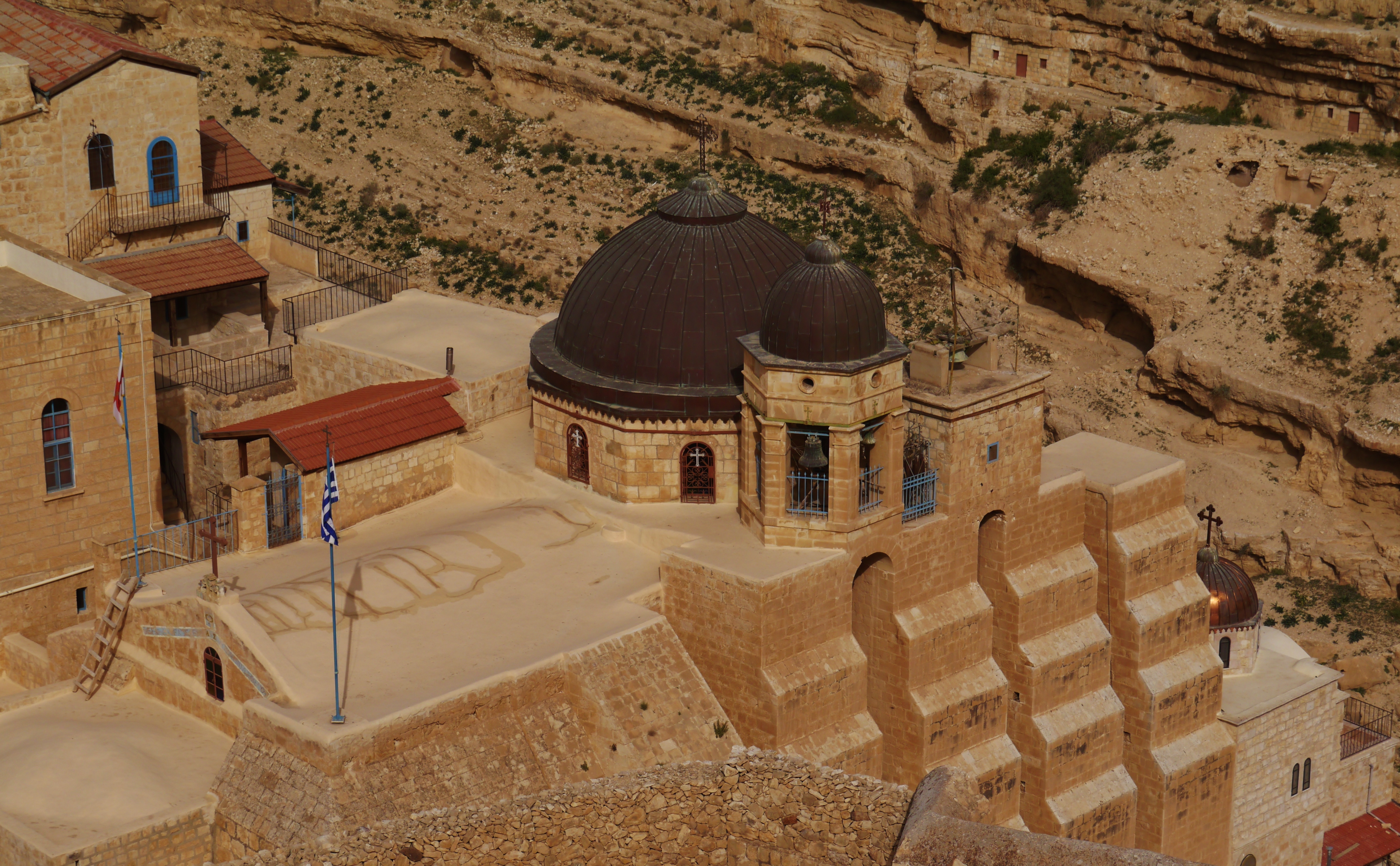
Mar Saba at Palestine — an important centre of monastic hymnography

In the early period between the 5th and the 7th centuries Sabaite concepts attracted the monastic communities of the Patriarchate of Jerusalem. In 692 the organisation of liturgical eight-week cycles connected with a system of eight modes called octoechos was established and progressed to a liturgical reform. Since only the melodies are known as they had been notated in chant books by the end of the 10th century, the question arises, what preceded the individual compositions of unique melodies, known as idiomela, when they had been composed within an oral tradition since the 7th century?

The first notated chant books (Sticherarion and Heirmologion), created between the 9th and the 13th centuries, delivered only a small part of the monastic hymn repertoire. The beginning of the book Octoechos, the cycle 24 stichera anastasima (three stichera in each echos) or the kekragarion cycle (Hesperinos Psalm 140), appeared very late in Byzantine chant books—some of them not earlier than during the late 17th century. For most of their history they did not need to be notated, since they closely followed the recitation models of psalmody using their formulaic accentuation patterns.

The reform of the Byzantine hymnody was the result of a first florescence of Greek hymnography created by singer-poets at Jerusalem like the Patriarch Sophronius (634–644), Germanos Bishop of Serachuze (died 669) and Andrew of Crete (died 713). The reform was followed by compositions of John of Damascus and his half-brother Cosmas, who continued the works of Andrew at Mar Saba. Even though the difference between "echos-melodies" and the new idiomela at that time cannot be studied, the new emphasis on the Hagiopolitan octoechos was only possible because these new hymns – their poetry and music – were appreciated and imitated beyond the patriarchate. In general this period is regarded as one when the concept of octoechos cycles was not new, but when these poets were translated and imitated throughout the Mediterranean. The heterogenous repertoire itself, whose avtomela were sometimes simple and formulaic, sometimes with the complexity of idiomela, was probably not collected before the Second Council of Nicaea. Yahya al-Mansur who was posthumously condemned as a heretic, was not only re-established as a hymnographer and monk called John of Damascus, but also became an important Greek church father and a saint.

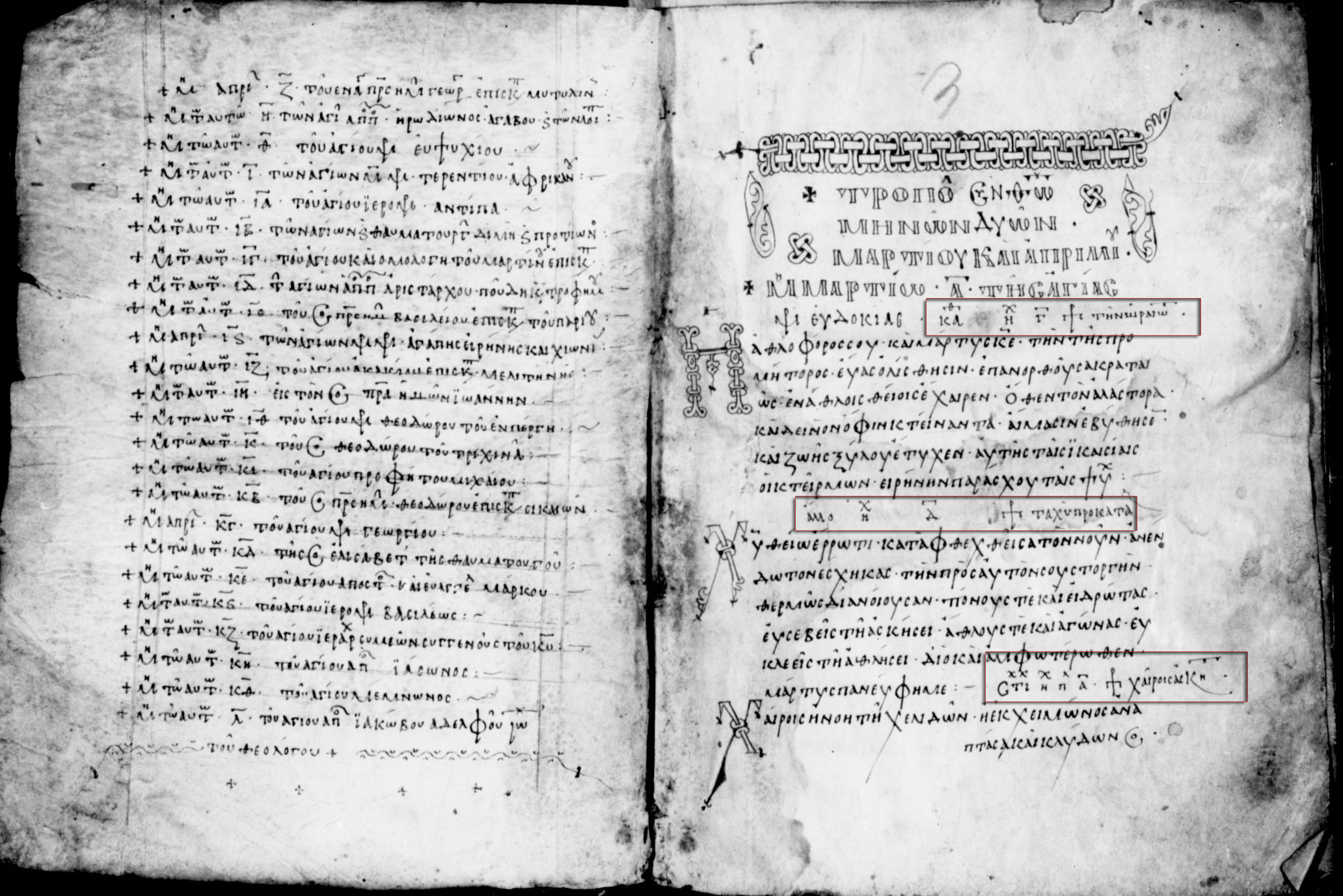
Menaion with two kathismata (echos tritos and tetartos) dedicated to Saint Eudokia (1 March) and the sticheron prosomoion χαῖροις ἡ νοητῇ χελιδῶν in ēchos plagios prōtos which has to be sung with the melos of the avtomelon χαῖροις ἀσκητικῶν. The scribe rubrified the book Τροπολόγιον σῦν Θεῷ τῶν μηνῶν δυῶν μαρτίου καὶ ἀπριλλίου (ET-MSsc Ms. Gr. 607, ff. 2v-3r)

During the reform of the Studites and at Sinai the avtomela were not notated, but they existed within an oral tradition. Even some idiomela served as models to compose new hymns according to the needs of a local liturgy—like the prosomoia for certain martyrs. When Theodore the Studite and his brother Joseph composed the early prosomoia for Hesperinos of Lenten tide, they used certain idiomela of the Triodion as models. Together with the later book Anastasimatarion (Sl. Voskresnik), "the book of resurrection hymns", the whole repertoire of avtomela is 140 and together with their prosomeia it is even larger than the whole repertoire of unique idiomela created in various regions.

With the Slavic reception in the medieval chant book Voskresnik, it was not possible to create the same complex relation between chant and text, when the prosomoia had been translated. So they created a system of simple avtomela melodies which could be easier adapted to the translated prosomoia.

In the monodic tradition of Byzantine chant, the reform of the 18th century, which created a new definition of the troparic, heirmologic, and fast sticheraric melos with simple melodies of the two fastest tempo levels, it was partly based on a living tradition of simple recitation out of text books without musical notation.

=== A kontakion as a model and its prosomoia ===
Similar to the case of the stichera idiomela used for the composition of new stichera needed for the Triodion cycle by Theodore and his brother Joseph, is the even more complex case of the kontakion genre which was based on 14 prooimia (used for the introductory stanza) and 13 oikoi (used for the sequence of all following stanzas) which had been used in independent combinations as melodic models for about 750 kontakia. Since the oikoi and the prooimion shared in each kontakion the same refrain, also different kontakia models could be combined within the same echos, because the melody of the refrain was usually the same, even if the text changed in different kontakia. Both, the model used for the recitation of the oikoi as well as the one used for the prooimion, had been rubrified as idiomela (not as avtomela) by Greek as well as by Slavic scribes of the Kievan Rus', whether in kontakaria without or with musical notation. Even the less melismatic form with several oikoi relied on a melodic system based on just 14 prooimia and 13 oikoi, which means that all the different oikoi of one kontakion had been sung as prosomoia according to one and the same oikos model.

As example might serve the prooimion of Romanos' kontakion for 25 December known by its incipit Ἡ παρθένος σήμερον, even if the melodic model in echos tritos is not testified by a notated source of his time. Among these 14 models for the prooimion and the 13 for the oikos, eight were chosen to create an oktoechos prosomoia cycle of the so-called "resurrection kontakia", each one did consist of one prooimion and one oikos.

According to the current practice of Orthodox chant, this resurrection kontakion could be chosen for regular Sunday services, if the week was dedicated to echos tritos. Its text was sung as a prosomoion to the melody of the famous kontakion for 25 December, which was already mentioned in the vita of Romanos as his own creation. Its prooimion has verses with 15, 15, 13, 13, 8, and 12 syllables, and the prosomoion of the resurrection kontakion for the same echos which was composed according to the meter of this stanza must have the same number of verses, each with the same number of syllables. Thus, the prosomoion can be sung with the same melody and the accentuation patterns of the idiomelon and the last verse was the refrain (called ephymnion ἐφύμνιον) the prooimion shared with the oikoi. The following table shows, how the syllables of the prosomoion come together with those of Romanos' prooimion and with its metric structure:

Verse	1	2	3	4	5	6	7	8	9	10	11	12	13	14	15	Whole line	Type
1	Ἡ	Παρ-	θέ-	νος	σή-	με-	ρον,	τὸν	ὑ-	πε-	ρού-	σι-	ον	τίκ-	τει,	Ἡ Παρθένος σήμερον, τὸν ὑπερούσιον τίκτει, The Virgin today to the Transcendent One gives birth	Idiomelon
1	‘Εξ-	α-	νέσ-	της	σή-	με-	ρον,	ἀ-	πὸ	τοῦ	τά-	φου	Οἰκ-	τίρ-	μον,	‘Εξανέστης σήμερον, ἀπὸ τοῦ τάφου Οἰκτίρμον, Out-resurrected today from the grave O Compassionate One	Prosomoion
2	καὶ	ἡ	γῆ	τὸ	Σπή-	λαι-	ον,	τῷ	ἀ-	προ-	σί-	τῳ	προ-	σά-	γει,	καὶ ἡ γῆ τὸ Σπήλαιον, τῷ ἀπροσίτῳ προσάγει. and the earth a cave to the Unapproachable One offers	Idiomelon
2	καὶ	ἡ-	μᾶς	ἐξ-	ή-	γα-	γες,	ἐκ	τῶν	πυ-	λῶν	τοῦ	θα-	νά-	του,	καὶ ἡμᾶς ἐξήγαγες, ἐκ τῶν πυλῶν τοῦ θανάτου, and us out-lifted from the gates of death	Prosomoion
3	Ἄγ-	γελ-	οι	με-	τὰ	Ποι-	μέ-	νων	δο-	ξο-	λο-	γοῦ-	σι.			Ἄγγελοι μετὰ Ποιμένων δοξολογοῦσι. Angels with shepherds glorify	Idiomelon
3	σή-	με-	ρον	Ἀ-	δὰμ	χο-	ρεύ-	ει,	καὶ	χαί-	ρει	Εὔ-	α,			σήμερον Ἀδὰμ χορεύει, καὶ χαίρει Εὔα, Today Adam exults, and rejoices ↔ Eve	Prosomoion
4	Μά-	γοι	δὲ	με-	τἀ	ἀσ-	τέ-	ρος	ὁ-	δοι-	πο-	ροῦ-	σι·			Μάγοι δὲ μετὰ ἀστέρος ὁδοιποροῦσι· Magi with a star journey	Idiomelon
4	ἅ-	μα	δέ,	καὶ	οἱ	Προ-	φῆ-	ται	σὺν	Πα-	τρι-	άρ-	χαις,			ἅμα δέ, καὶ οἱ Προφῆται, σὺν Πατριάρχαις, together both the prophets with patriarchs	Prosomoion
5	δι'	ἡ-	μᾶς	γὰρ	ἐ-	γεν-	νή-	θη,								δι' ἡμᾶς γὰρ ἐγεννήθη, For to us is born	Idiomelon
5	ἀ-	νυ-	μνοῦ-	σιν	ἀ-	κα-	τα-	παύ-	στως,							ἀνυμνοῦσιν ἀκαταπαύστως, sing unceasingly,	Prosomoion
ἐφ	Παι-	δί-	ον	νέ-	ον,	ὁ	πρὸ	αἰ-	ώ-	νων	Θε-	ός.				Παιδίον νέον, ὁ πρὸ αἰώνων Θεός. An Infant young, the pre-ages God!	Idiomelon
ἐφ	Τὸ	θεῖ-	ον	κρά-	τος	τῆς	ἐξ-	ου-	σί-	ας	σου.					Τὸ θεῖον κράτος τῆς ἐξουσίας σου. The divine mightiness of power ↔ your!	Prosomoion

Although the stanza was reproduced accurately by the composition of the prosomoion concerning the number of syllables, especially circumflex and grave accents (Greek diacritics) appear not always on the same syllable. In the second half of the third verse the idiomelon has just one circumflex accent, while the prosomoion has two acute ones. The different positions of acute accents in the fifth verse can be explained by the different verse structure and the shorter refrain of the prosomoion (9 + 11 instead of 8 + 12 syllables). Within the same verse the acute accent on the seventh syllable moves to the eighth in the prosomoion, so that the melodic accentuation pattern has to move to the next syllable. Thus, the cadence of the verse will be delayed. Otherwise the melodic recitation will be not only against the correct pronunciation of the word, but also against the meter and the characteristic that the melody of the refrain must go with the last verse. In fact, it is not only about one syllable shorter, but the last syllable has also no accent and must therefore change the melody of the refrain. A less problematic kontakion-prosomoion is the one composed for St Nicholas (see quotation below), although it has less syllables than Romanos' kontakion (the third and fourth verses have just 12 syllables and not 13), but the final section around the refrain fits much better.

With the recitation known from a living tradition, the melody reproduces the meter with melodic accentuation patterns and quantitative accents given by the rhythm of the model stanza. With respect to the differences which already appear between prosomoion and its prototype within the Greek language, a translation into Church Slavonic which reproduces exactly all these relations between idiomelos and avtomelon—whether in this or another way—, seems already impossible. Nevertheless, the schools at Ohrid in Macedonia and later at Novgorod and Moscow which did not know the translations made at Ohrid were quite fearless and creative.

This is a possible modern transcription of the same kondak, based on different redactions of the Old Church Slavonic translation:

Дева днесь Пресущественнаго раждает,
и земля вертеп Неприступному приносит,
ангели с пастырьми славословят,
волсви же со звездою путешествуют:
нас бо ради родися
Отроча Младо, Превечный Бог

Дѣва дьньсь преволгатаго ражаѥть
и землѧ вьртьпъ не прикосновено приносить
ангели съ пастырил словословестѧть
вълсви же съ звѣздою пѹть шьствѹють·
насъ бо ради родисѧ
отрочѧ младо превѣчьныи богъ

This is the resurrection kontakion composed over Romanos' kontakion to emphasise that it was a very common model used to compose most of the kontakia in echos tritos:

‘Εξανέστης σήμερον, ἀπὸ τοῦ τάφου Οἰκτίρμον,
καὶ ἡμᾶς ἐξήγα[γ]ες, ἐκ τῶν πυ[λῶν τοῦ θ]α[νάτ]ου,
ἡμὰρ ἐκ [τοῦ τ]άφου,

συν ἀναστήσας χρίστε

Въскрьсъ дьнесь из гроба Щедрыи и насъ избави
отъ вратъ съмьртьныихъ дьньсь
Адамъ ликѹѥть и веселитьсѧ и Еѵга
Авраамъ же и пророци съ патриархы
ꙗко въскрьсе Живодавьчь

Two other kontakia-prosomoia which had been composed for other occasions:

Ἐν τοῖς μύροις ἅγιε ἰερουργὸς ἀνεδείχθης
τοῦ Χριστοῦ γὰρ ὅσιε τὸ εὐαγγέλιον πληρώσας
ἔθηκας τὴν ψυχὴν σου ὑπερ λαοῦ σου
ἔσωσας τοὺς ἀθώους ἐκ τοῦ θανάτου
διὰ τοῦτο ἡγιάσθης
ὁμέγας μύστης τοῦ Θεοῦ τῆς χάριτος

Въсиꙗ дьньсь прҍславьнаꙗ съзывающи насъ памѧть ваю
мѹченика Христова Романе и Давыде съзывающи насъ
на похвалениѥ славҍ Христа Бога нашего
тҍмь и притҍкающе къ рачҍ мощи и ваю
ицҍлѥниꙗ дары приѥмлемъ вы
ибо божьствьнаѧ врача ѥста

In the Slavic kondakar' and the Constantinopolitan kontakarion of the 13th century the kontakion had developed to a representative melismatic style, but also the poetic structure did not always obey strictly the rules of syntonia and isosyllabic verses (especially not between the languages to which the Greek hymns had been translated). The extract visible here only includes two thirds of the first melodic phrase of the model which was used to compose the first verse pair. It was obviously possible to adapt even verses of different length to the model:

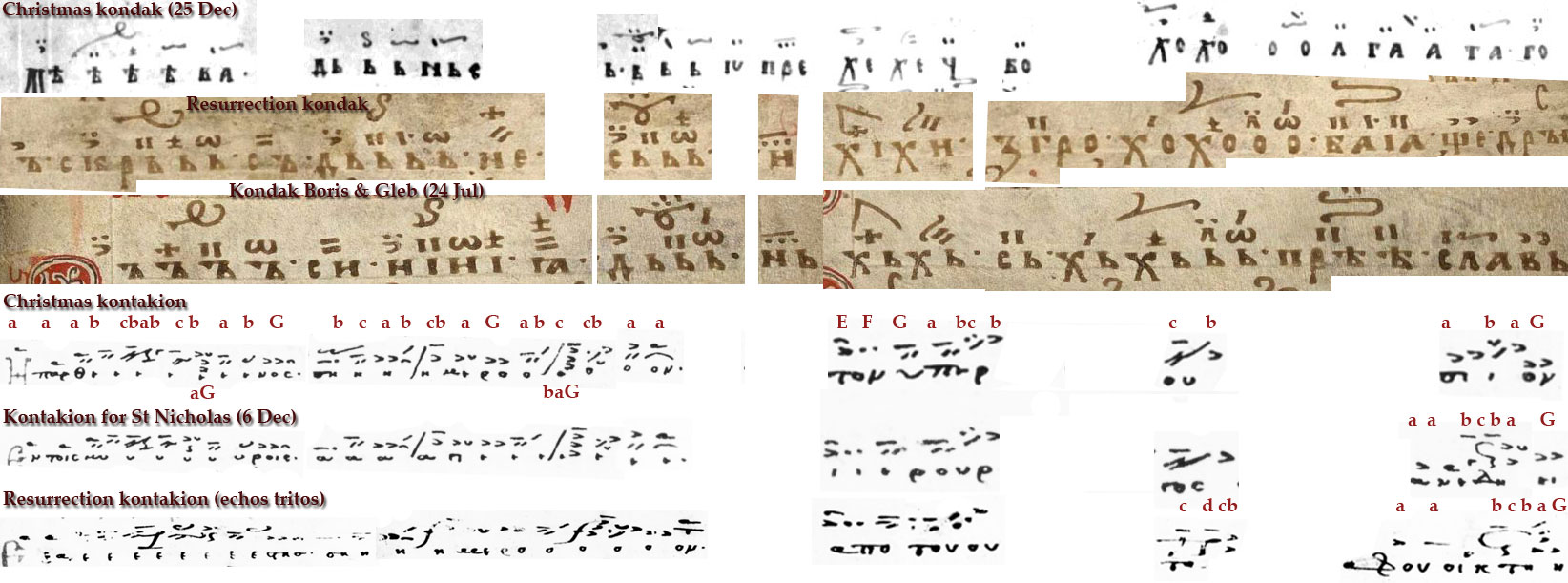
Kontakion Ἡ παρθένος σήμερον (Дѣва дньсь пребогата ражаѥть) for Nativity (25 December) in echos tritos and their prosomoia (podobni): the Resurrection kontakion, the kondak for Boris and Gleb (24 July) and Nicholas (6 December) kontakion (RUS-SPsc Ms. Q.п.I.32, ff.52 & 76; ET-MSsc Ms. Gr. 1280, ff.131r-132v & 117v-119r; Ms. Gr. 1314, f.212)

A very important source of the re-translation of the Greek hymns are the so-called mineya služebnaya of the Kievan Rus' written during the 12th century, office menaia which had been fully notated (especially the akrosticha composed over the heirmoi and the stichera idiomela). Obviously the kondaks and the podobni were regarded as less problematic, because they had not been provided with notation.

The confrontation with two living traditions shows that even the avtomela of the Greek Orthodox tradition are less sophisticated than the Byzantine one during the 10th or 14th century. These stichera were composed within the Hagiopolitan octoechos and adapted to the Papadike. In the medieval manuscripts is a more complicated model following 14 prototypes of kontakia which represented the Constantinopolitan tonal system chanted at the Hagia Sophia: Romanos' kontakion Ἡ παρθένος σήμερον was the model for the mesos tritos.

Although they were originally an almost syllabic setting of the hymn text, it was a complex idiomelon which became more elaborated by the end of the 9th century. The recitation today follows the troparic genre of the Neobyzantine octoechos according to the New Method, as it was created during the 18th century between Petros Peloponnesios and Theodore Phokaeos who supervised the print editions of Chourmouzios' transcriptions. Each genre was defined by its own octoechos and its tempo which created a new variety, but the accentuation patterns can be used in a more flexible way with respect to the high Middle Ages. The incision within the fifth verse follows clearly the syntax of the avtomelon text. This flexibility comes closer to the earlier practice of recitation employing "echos-melodies", although the accentuation of accents are still very precise, because the diacritics were still used and the simplified model has sublimed its ancient tradition. The polyphonic or multi-part recitation of the Karelian monastery on the island Valaam, known and admired as Valaamskiy rozpev, does not care very much about the text accents which once created the sophisticated idiomela between the 7th and the 10th centuries. It simply repeats melodic patterns, while the monks observe carefully the half verses and thus, the last two verses are structured as one phrase divided into three parts. This practice offers an amazing concept of singing na glas, as it could survive within an oral transmission high up in the North.

=== Caveat about north Slavic music ===
While the Bulgarians and Serbs use Byzantine music, adapted as explained above, Russians and other northern Slavs use polyphonic recitation models. They are less dependent on a monodic patterns of a certain glas, but simply melodies in the ambitus of the echos in question. In their case, all idiomela (самогласны) for a given glas are sung to the same melody and an avtomelon (самоподобенъ) and its prosomoia (подобны) are simply other melodies related to a certain recitation model as in case of the kondak.

== See also ==
- Menaion
- Menologion
- Oktoechos and Parakletike
- Pentekostarion
- Sticherarion
- Triodion
