= Sticheron =

Type of hymn sung in churches

A sticheron (Greek: στιχηρόν "set in verses"; plural: stichera; Greek: στιχηρά) is a hymn of a particular genre sung during the daily evening (Hesperinos/Vespers) and morning (Orthros) offices, and some other services, of the Eastern Orthodox and Byzantine Catholic churches.

Stichera are usually sung in alternation with or immediately after psalm or other scriptural verses. These verses are known as stichoi (sing: stichos), but sticheraric poetry usually follows the hexameter and is collected in a book called sticherarion (Greek: στιχηράριον). A sticherarion is a book containing the stichera for the morning and evening services throughout the year, but chant compositions in the sticheraric melos can also be found in other liturgical books like the Octoechos or the Anastasimatarion, or in the Anthology for the Divine Liturgy.

== The sticheraric melos and the troparion ==
In the current traditions of Orthodox Chant, the sticherarion as a hymn book was also used to call a chant genre sticheraric melos, which is defined by its tempo and its melodic formulas according to the eight modes of the Octoechos. Although the hymns of the sticherarion have to be sung in the same melos, there is no direct relation with the poetic hymn genre, because its musical definition rather follows the practice of psalmody. Today the sticheraric melos as opposed to the troparic melos are two different cycles of the Octoechos.

In the past, they had been closer related by the practice of psalmody, and a troparion which is nothing else than a refrain sung with psalmody, might become a more elaborated chant from a musical point of view, so that it is sung thrice without the psalm verses, but with the small doxology. The troparion in its melodic form tends to move towards the sticheraric or even papadic melos, and this way, it becomes an own chant genre by itself.

== The sticheron and its musical settings ==
Christian Troelsgård described the sticheron quite similar to the troparion and regarded the sticheron as a subcategory, only that a sticheron as an intercalation of psalmody, has been longer as a poem than a troparion, thus it had been chanted without repetitions of its text, but in sections. There had been a lot of stichera, but the book sticherarion was a rather dislocated collection of stichera from different local traditions and their singer-poets. It was obviously not used on a pulpit during celebrations, but rather an exercise book with various examples which could be studied for own compositions with similar accentuation patterns.

Concerning this paradigmatic use of notation the musical setting of a sticheron, the sticherarion had been mainly a collection of idiomela which had to be understood as individual compositions for a certain sticheron poem, although the melodic patterns could be rather classified according to one of the eight or ten modes (echos or glas) of the Hagiopolitan Octoechos. The reference to it is given by the modal signatures, especially the medial signatures written within notation, so the book sticherarion constituted the synthetic role of its notation (Byzantine round notation), which integrated signs taken from different chant books during the 13th century.

But there was as well the practice of using certain stichera as models (avtomela) to compose other poems (prosomoia), similar to the heirmos. This classification became even more complex by the translation of the hymn books into Slavonic, which forced the kanonarches, responsible for the preparation of the services, to adapt the music of a certain avtomelon to the translated prosomoia and the prosody of the Slavonic language, in certain cases the adaptation needed a musical recomposition of the prosomoion. In practice, the avtomela as well as the prosomeia are often omitted in the books of the sticherarion, they rather belonged to an oral tradition, since the avtomela were known by heart. Often the prosomoia had been written apart before the Octoechos part of Sticherarion, which was usually not organised according to the eight modes unlike the Great Oktoechos.

Since John Koukouzeles and other contemporary scribes who revised the sticheraria, there was development from the traditional sticheron, sung by a whole congregation or community, to a rather representative and elaborated performance by a soloist. Manuel Chrysaphes regarded John Koukouzeles as the inventor of the "embellished sticheron" (sticheron kalophonikon), but he emphasized that he always followed step by step the model, as it has been written down in sticherarion. Especially in the kalophonic genre, a systematic collection of compositions by Constantinopolitan maistores, made after the menaion of sticherarion, could already grow, as one part of the sticherarion kalophonikon (see also GB-Lbl Ms. Add. 28821), to a volume about 1900 pages, an expansion in chant which could be hardly performed during celebrations of any cathedral of the Empire.

== History of the notated chant book Sticherarion ==
During the reform of the 17th century the book Sticherarion was replaced by the Doxastarion, called after the main genre of the former book, the doxastikon: the sticheron which was introduced by both or one of the two stichoi of Δόξα πατρὶ, but it followed the same compositions written down in the old Sticherarion. During the 18th century, the repertoire was created which had been printed as Doxastarion since 1820. It was based on transcriptions of the hyphos, short versions created by the generation of Ioannes Trapezountios and Daniel the Protopsaltes who had recomposed the traditional melodies. The hyphos was supposed to abridge the traditional melos in the school of Manuel Chrysaphes, as it had been delivered by 17th-century composers like Panagiotes the New Chrysaphes and Germanos of New Patras. They had grown very long, obviously under influence of the kalophonic method to do the thesis of the sticheraric melos, but also by a hybridisation of the great signs during the traditional thesis of the sticheric melos. Between the 1820 and 1841, the abridged Doxastarion had been published in 3 versions: the "Doxastarion syntomon" of Petros Peloponnesios (1820), the "Doxastarion argon" of Iakovos the Protoposaltes (1836), and the "Doxastarion argosyntomon" of Konstantinos the Protopsaltes (1841).

The medieval Sticherarion had been divided into four books, which also existed as separated books of their own: the Menaion, the Pentekostarion, the Triodion, and the Octoechos. These books of the Sticherarion were created during the Studites reform between the 9th and the 10th centuries, its repertoire was completed until the 11th century, but until the 14th century the whole repertoire had been reduced among scribes who changed and unified the numerous redactions. The 10th-century reform already defined the gospel lectures and the doxastika connected with them. The oldest copies can be dated back to the 10th and 11th centuries, and like the Heirmologion the Sticherarion was one of the first hymn books, which was entirely provided with musical notation (Palaeo Byzantine neumes). But the complete form still appeared in the time of the 14th-century reform, which had been notated in Middle Byzantine neumes.

The genre sticheron already existed since centuries, it can be traced back to Tropologia written during the 6th century, but the repertoire as it can be reconstructed by Georgian Iadgari Tropologion seems to be different from the Byzantine redaction which was based on the Tropologion of Antioch and later expanded by the hymnographers of Mar Saba (Jerusalem). The book Tropologion was still used until the 12th century and it also contains the canons of the Heirmologion. Originally the Heirmologion and Sticherarion were created as notated chant books during the 10th century.

== The parts and cycles of the book sticherarion ==
The stichera idiomela are commonly written in two liturgical year cycles, the immobile one or sanctoral, and the mobile one between Great Lent and Pentecost. Usually, this collection of idiomela consists of three books, the menaion for the immobile cycle and two books called triodion and pentecostarion for the mobile cycle:

- Menaion ("book of the months") contains all hymns of the immobile monthly cycle beginning with September end ending with August. These are hymns dedicated to particular saints commemorated according to the calendar day of the year.
- Triodion contains hymns chanted during Great Lent, beginning with the Sunday of Pharisee and the Publican ten weeks before Easter and ending with the Holy week preceding Easter or with Palm Sunday. It has a huge collection of stichera prosomoia as well.
- Pentecostarion contains hymns chanted during the Paschal Season, beginning with the hesperinos of the Resurrection feast or Monday of the Holy Week until All Saints' Sunday which follows the Sunday of Pentecost.

The old sticherarion had even a fourth book which contained the hymns of a third regularly repeated cycle. It was usually the abridged form that only contained the hymns of Saturday hesperinos preceding the orthros and divine liturgy on Sunday. In most of the Orthodox rites the octoechos meant a cycle of eight weeks which opened with the four kyrioi echoi (each echos per week) and continued with the plagioi echoi. Sometimes the sticherarion also had a separated collection of notated stichera prosomoia preceding the book Octoechos, while the Octoechos contained the best known hymns called stichera avtomela which also served as model for the prosomoia. Originally many of them were even notated quite late, since the singers knew them by heart. The early form was quite short and not yet divided into eight parts according to the eight echoi of the weekly cycle.

- Octoechos contains either the hymns for each Saturday or those for each day of the week (Great Octoechos), set to the eight echoi. Using one echos or glas for each week, the entire cycle takes eight weeks to complete. This part of the sticherarion became soon an own book, in certain traditions this separated book also included the odes of the canon—the hymns of the book Heirmologion.

== Cycles of the book Octoechos ==
Examples of different liturgical contexts where stichera are commonly used include:

- Hesperinos (the evening office of the Canonical Hours)
  - Vesper psalm Κύριε ἐκέκραξα, Господи воззвахъ к'тебѣ ("Lord, I Have Cried", Ps. 140.1)
  - The Litiy (procession on Sundays and feast days)
  - The aposticha
- Orthros (the morning office)
  - The Praises (on Sundays and Feast Days)
  - The aposticha (on simple weekdays)

== Types of stichera ==
- A sticheron that follows the words, "Glory to the Father, and to the Son, and to the Holy Spirit" is called a doxastichon.
- A sticheron that is dedicated to the Theotokos is called "sticheron dogmatikon" or "theotokion."
  - Theotokia normally follow the last words of the small doxology "Both now and ever, and unto the ages of ages amen."
  - Those theotokia that come by the end of Κύριε ἐκέκραξα or Господи, воззвахъ к'тєбѣ ("Lord, I Have Cried", Ps 140.1) during Vespers on Saturday night, Friday night and the eves of most Feast Days are called "dogmatika, because their texts deal with the dogma of the Incarnation.
- The aposticha are a type of stichera which differ from the norm with respect, that they precede their stichos (psalm verse) rather than they follow it.

== See also ==
- Aposticha
- Avtomelon, Prosomoia
- Debates about the Sticheraric Melos
- Doxastikon
- Hagiopolitan Octoechos
- Matins Gospel
- Menaion
- Oktoechos mega
- Pentekostarion
- Triodion
- Troparion
