= Aposticha =

Set of hymns accompanied by psalm verses

The Aposticha (Greek: Άπόστιχα'; Slavonic: стїхи̑ры на стихо́внѣ stikhíry na stikhóvne) are a set of hymns (stichera) accompanied by psalm verses (stichos) that are chanted towards the end of Vespers and Matins in the Eastern Orthodox Church and those Eastern Catholic Churches that follow the Byzantine Rite.

== Description ==
The Greek term literally means "[hymns] on the verses." The aposticha belong to a family of hymns, known as stichera, which are normally tied to psalm verses in the Daily Office. Unlike other stichera, which normally follow their psalm verses, the aposticha are unique in that they precede their psalm verses.

Aposticha are found at Vespers every day (except when the Liturgy, whether of St. John Chrysostom, St. Basil or the Presanctified Gifts, follows), and at Great Compline when it forms part of a vigil (for Christmas, Theophany and the Annunciation), but at Matins they occur only on ordinary weekdays, being omitted on higher-ranking feast days.

At Vespers on Sundays (i.e., Saturday evening) there is one more sticheron than on weekdays. The aposticha at Sunday Vespers form an acrostic in the original Greek (the first sticheron is not part of the acrostic).

== Sources ==
- Archimandrite Ephrem, "Aposticha" and "Sticheron" in Blackwell Dictionary of Eastern Christianity (Oxford: Blackwell Publishing, 1999.) ISBN 0-631-18966-1
- Monks of New Skete, "Introduction" in Hymns of Entreaty (Cambridge, New York: New Skete, 1987.) ISBN 0-935129-09-X
