= Eastern Orthodox worship =

Worship in the Eastern Orthodox Christian Church

Eastern Orthodox worship in this article is distinguished from Eastern Orthodox prayer in that 'worship' refers to the activity of the Christian Church as a body offering up prayers to God while 'prayer' refers to the individual devotional traditions of the Orthodox.

The worship of the Eastern Orthodox Church is viewed as the church's fundamental activity because the worship of God is the joining of man to God in prayer and that is the essential function of Christ's Church. The Eastern Orthodox view their church as being the living embodiment of Christ, through the grace of His Holy Spirit, in the people, clergy, monks and all other members of the church. Thus the church is viewed as the Body of Christ on earth which is perpetually unified with the Body of Christ in heaven through a common act of worship to God.

This article deals first with the various characteristics of Orthodox worship, aside from its theological foundations as laid forth above, and then continues to give the services of worship themselves and their structure.

== Characteristics of Eastern Orthodox worship ==
=== Physical ===
As explained above, the Orthodox draw no distinction between the Body of Christ in heaven and that on earth, viewing both parts of the church as inseparable and in continuous worship together of God. Orthodox worship therefore expresses this unity of earth and heaven in every possible way so that the earthly worshippers are continually reminded through all their senses of the heavenly state of the church. The particular methods for doing this are very far from arbitrary but have been passed down from the earliest periods in Christian history through what the Orthodox call "Holy Tradition".

=== Sights ===
Probably the most striking aspect of Orthodox worship is its visual characteristics. These are many and varied, always conveying in the most striking colors and shapes possible the various phases and moods of the church both as they change throughout the year and in individual services.

==== Icons ====
Icons are used to bring the worshippers into the presence of those who are in heaven, that is, Christ, the Theotokos, the Saints and the angels. The Orthodox believe these icons do more than visually remind the viewer of the fact that there are saints in heaven, they believe that these icons act as 'windows' into heaven through which they see Christ, the Theotokos and those saints. It is for this reason that God the father is traditionally not represented in icons because He has never shown His form to man and therefore man should not try to represent His form in icons. It is because of the connection which these sacred pictures have with their subjects that Orthodox Christians regularly venerate (but do not worship) them even as Orthodox still living on earth greet one another with a kiss of peace, so do they venerate those who have passed on through their icons.

==== Architecture ====
Both the internal and external forms of Orthodox churches are designed in imitation of heaven. The internal layout consists of three main parts: the narthex, nave and altar. The royal doors divide the narthex from the nave and the iconostasis divides the nave from the altar. The narthex or porch is the entrance to the church building and not yet the actual 'church' proper, and is a small open space often with some candles to buy before entering the church itself. Once through the royal doors (a term often applied now to the doors in the center of the iconostasis as well) there is the nave, which is the main and largest part of the church building. Here all the laity and choir stand (there are often few or no seats in the building) during worship; it is shaped rectangularly in the back, opening into two wings forming a cross towards the front. Through the iconostasis (always done through the 'Deacon's doors' on either side except during processions by the clergy) lies the altar (or sanctuary). This area is considered the most holy of the whole church, and laity other than church personnel are discouraged from entering. The altar is square (completing the cross shape of the church building) and at its center is the altar table on which the Eucharist is celebrated and which only clergy may touch. There is no direct entrance to the outside of the church to the altar, only the deacons' doors and a door to the sacristy (which usually leads outside). The main entrance from the nave to the sanctuary, the "beautiful gate", cannot be used by deacons and laity, only by priests or bishops.

==== Vestments ====
All those above lay status (the choir is considered to be lay as it sings in place of the congregation) wear some form of vestment to distinguish their office. There are many offices and each has its own distinctive vestment and each set of vestments becomes increasingly elaborate as the rank of the wearer increases; this principle also holds true for how weighty a service is being served. All these vestments are in the style of robes (or designed to go with robes) made of colored and decorated cloth. The colors of all the vestments change according to what feast the church is celebrating (these changes occur in a seasonal fashion, not with the seasons but on a similar timescale). For instance, for about two months after the celebration of the Resurrection, all church vestments are bright white and red whereas during the solemnity of Lent they are dark purples; thus, vestments serve to express the 'mood' of the church.

==== Processions ====
As most actions in Orthodox worship, processions are most often used to commemorate events and also, of course, to display items of religious, and particularly Orthodox, significance. Their most fundamental purpose however is, as everything in Orthodox worship, to aid in the edification and salvation of the worshippers by giving glory to God. Processions are always led by a number of altar servers bearing candles, fans (ornamented discs with angelic visages represented), crosses, banners or other processional implements relative to the occasion. After them come the subdeacons, deacons and archdeacons with censers (ornamental containers of burning coal for burning incense), then priests and archpriests and so on up the clergical ranks. This is the very 'ideal' in processions, most do not contain all these elements because the occasion may not warrant it. The reasons for why various processions are done at various times vary greatly.

==== Candles ====
Candles are used extensively throughout the church during services and after. They are viewed as continual, inanimate prayers offered by the candle's 'benefactor' to God or saints usually on behalf of a third party, although they can be offered for any purpose. Candlestands are placed in front of particularly significant icons throughout Orthodox churches, these always have a central candle burning on behalf of the church as a whole but have room for Orthodox to place candles. In particular candlestands are placed in front of the four principle icons on the iconostasis: the icon of Christ, the Theotokos, John the Baptist and the temple's patron. Candles are not restricted to this usage however, besides being used in processions a candle is kept burning above the royal doors in the iconostasis, candles in a seven-branched candelabrum are burned during services on the altar (following in the footsteps of the seven branched candlestand in the Old Testament) as well as other candles used at various times in the church year for special purposes. (see Dikri and Trikri)

=== Sounds ===
The Eastern Orthodox Church traditionally does not use any instruments in the liturgy, instead relying entirely on choral music and chanting. Essentially all the words of Orthodox services, except sermons and such, are either chanted or sung by readers and choirs and when possible the congregations.

==== Chanting ====
Nothing in Orthodox worship is simply said aloud; although priests and, occasionally deacons, recite certain prayers or petitions silently (unable to be heard by anyone not in the immediately proximity) everything audible is sung or chanted. Chanting in the Orthodox tradition can be described as being halfway between talking and singing; it is musical but not music. Only a few notes are used in chanting, and the chanter reads the words to these notes at a steady rhythm. The notes and rhythms used vary according to what the occasion is, but generally chanting is relatively low-toned and steadily rhythmic creating a calming sound. Chanting not only is conducive to a calm and elevated state of mind but also allows chanters to read through large portions of texts (particularly Psalms) more clearly and quickly than possible with normal speech while also conveying the poetry in the words. That is the essential reason for chanting. Worship at its heart is a song and is beautiful; therefore the words of Orthodox worship cannot be simply said but must be melodiously chanted to express the true nature and purpose of the words.

==== Singing ====
Depending in large part on local custom, a pair of groups of chanters or of choirs do the singing, although sometimes the entire congregation does so.

For the composition of religious music, traditionally a system of eight echoi (church modes of the Byzantine musical system of eight modes) is employed and many melodies are composed in each echos. The proper of much hymnography is derived from a book, the Octoechos, with texts for each weekday in each tone, and the tones rotate weekly.

Singing naturally developed from chanting but, unlike in the west, Orthodox music developed from a Greek musical background. Even though Orthodoxy has spread and its music adapted to its various regions, still Orthodox music is distinctive from European music. Singing is used in place of chanting on important occasions thus some things which are chanted at minor services are sung at more important services. Singing is as varied and multi-faceted in its forms as chanting and vestments, it changes with the church 'seasons' of commemoration thus singing during Great Lent is always somber and during Holy Week nearly becomes a sorrowful dirge while during Pascha (Easter) and the Paschal season the notes are high and quick and as joyful as they were sad during Lent. The power of music is not lost on the Orthodox and it is used to its full effect to bring about spiritual renewal in the listeners.

==== Bells ====
In Russian and Greek Orthodox churches bells are often used. The size of the bells can vary widely as can their number and complexity of tone. Generally however they are rung to announce the beginning and end of services or to proclaim especially significant moments in the services. They are not used as musical instruments in the strict sense, that is, they are not used in conjunction with a choir and are not a part of the worship itself and are always positioned outside the church building.

=== Scents ===
In Orthodox worship, even the sense of smell is used to enlighten the minds and hearts of the worshipers, bringing them into closer communion with God. This is done primarily through the use of incense, but it is not uncommon at certain times of the year to decorate the interior of Orthodox temples with aromatic flowers and herbs.

==== Incense ====
Incense in the Eastern Orthodox Church is burned at essentially every worship service usually multiple times. This is always done by burning granulated incense on a hot coal inside a censer. The censer is essentially two metal bowls suspended by chains and which can be raised and lowered to allow more or less smoke out. Incense is burned, in accordance with Old Testament tradition, as an essential mode of worship to God and is burned in token of reverence to objects of sanctity such as relics, bishops, icons, the congregation and many other besides. During the course of every service, all objects of repute are censed by the deacon or priest. This is done by swinging the censer forward and bringing it back sending a cloud of aromatic smoke towards the object being censed.

==== Other aromas ====
Scented oils are also used, sometimes to anoint the feast day icon, or added to the olive oil which is blessed for anointing during the All-Night Vigil. Or the faithful may be blessed by the priest sprinkling them with rose water.

There are also times when fragrant plants are used. For instance, on the Great Feast of the Dormition of the Theotokos there is a special "Blessing of Fragrant Herbage" which takes place after the Divine Liturgy. On the Great Feast of Pentecost it is customary to fill the church with greenery, sometimes fresh hay or grass is spread about the floor, and the faithful often stand holding flowers during the services on this day, especially at the Vespers service on the afternoon of Pentecost Sunday.

=== Actions ===
The Eastern Orthodox Church is fully conscious of the importance of the physical in general and of the human body in particular. As a result, Orthodox worship does not neglect to incorporate the body into its worship and to enlighten the worshippers through it as through any other medium.

==== The Sign of the Cross ====
The sign of the cross (three fingers imprinted on the forehead, torso, right then left shoulders) is the most fundamental religious action of the Eastern Orthodox Church and is performed very frequently in Orthodox worship. This action is, of course, done in remembrance and invocation of the Cross of Christ. This can be meant for protection from adverse powers, in reverence for something or someone, in compunction or love or for a multitude of other reasons not nearly so specific. The Orthodox view it as a way of purifying the body and soul and the Orthodox oral tradition is very strong in viewing it as a weapon against demons and their activities.

==== Standing and kneeling ====
To express the respect of God which is congruent with the worship of Him, Orthodox stand while in worship as if they were in the presence of a king. Traditionally, women stand on in the north side of the church in front of the icon of the Mother of God while the men stand on in the south side of the church in front of the icon of Christ; now however this is rarely done and worshipers simply stand in any open space in the nave facing the altar and praying silently or singing as they stand. In most Orthodox churches, the congregants stand through the entire service with the exception of the elderly who may choose to sit in chairs or on benches in the back or along the sides of the church. In the diaspora some churches have pews. While prostrations and kneeling are prescribed during some occasional vespers, matins, or other special services through the church year, these are an expression of penitence and deep compunction and so restricted almost exclusively to Lenten services. For instance, at the Lenten presanctified liturgy during the Lord's Prayer all people, clergy and laity, prostrate or kneel. In contrast, on Sundays and from Pascha to Pentecost, kneeling is prohibited in accordance with the First Council of Nicaea's decree "that prayer be made to God standing".

==== Bowing and prostrating ====
A bow in the Eastern Orthodox Church consists of a person making the sign of the cross and then bowing from the waist and touching the floor with their fingers. This action is done extensively throughout all Orthodox services and is a fundamental way that the Orthodox express their reverence and subservience to God. For instance, at the culminating point of the consecration of the Eucharist all the Orthodox make a bow while saying "Amen". Bows are used more extensively in Lent than at any other time. Three bows are done when entering an Orthodox church and a series of bows are performed when venerating the central icons in the nave. A prostration in the Orthodox tradition is the action in which a person makes the sign of the cross and, going to his knees, touches the floor with his head. Prostrations express to an even greater degree the reverence evinced by a bow and both are used as tools to train the mind in reverence of God through the obeisance of the body. A prostration is always done upon entering the altar (sanctuary) on weekdays. They are used in the most profusion during Lent.

==== Greetings and blessings ====
Even as Orthodox venerate and do reverence to icons and the church building as being physical objects filled with divine grace so too they greet one another. Traditionally this is done whenever or wherever Orthodox meet one another but in common usage the traditional greetings between lay people are usually done in ritual contexts (during services or such activities). Orthodox greetings are, just like the veneration of icons, expressions of love and reverence for the person being greeted. Greetings between lay people of equal rank are done by the parties grasping one another's right hand and then kissing each other on both cheeks, the right first, then left and right again. Between clergy of equal rank the same is done but at the end the parties kiss one another on the hand. Orthodox of lower ranks (lay people, altar servers and deacons) when meeting Orthodox priests (or higher ranks) receive a blessing by folding their hands (right over left) palm upwards while he of the priestly office makes the sign of the cross in the air with his hand over the folded hands of the lay person and then places that hand on the folded hands of he of lower rank for him to kiss. This is done because the Orthodox view the priestly office as the one through which Christ lives with his people and thus the blessing is the essential bestowing of Christ's love and grace through His priest to the Orthodox person being blessed. Blessings like this are also used during services to signify the approval of Christ and the Eastern Orthodox Church for some action a lower order person is going to do.

=== Tastes ===
Orthodox worship, in keeping with the earliest traditions of Christian worship, involves eating as part of services probably more than any other denomination. Besides the bread and wine in the Eucharist, bread, wine, wheat, fruits and other foods are eaten at a number of special services. The kinds of foods used vary widely from culture to culture. During special memorial services, a special sweet called Koliva is blessed and served in memory of the departed. In Slavic tradition, a dinner follows the Divine Liturgy to break the fast of midnight.

==== Bread ====
Bread is by far the most common Orthodox repast in worship and is always leavened. Bread is viewed theologically as the quintessential food, the symbol of sustenance and life. As such, it is also considered to be the central component of communal meals and a mainstay of brotherhood. Although its use for Prosphora and in the Eucharist are ancient and universal, the various other kinds of ecclesial breads and their purposes vary widely from country to country as do their associated services. These services usually are associated with seasonal prayers, such as the harvest.

The most common non-Eucharistic bread is the artos. This is in two forms: five smaller loaves which are blessed during a portion of the All-Night Vigil known as the Artoklassia (literally, "breaking of bread"); and a single, large loaf which is blessed during the Paschal Vigil and then remains in the church during Bright Week (Easter Week). This Artos (capitalized because it symbolizes the Resurrected Jesus) is venerated by the faithful when they enter or leave the church during Bright Week. Then, on Bright Saturday, the priest says a prayer over the Artos and it is broken up and distributed among the faithful as an evlogia (blessing).

==== Wine ====
The continual companion of bread in the church is wine which is also seen with it in the Eucharist and Prosphora. Wine is viewed theologically as the symbol of the joy and happiness which God gives to man. Thus it is also thought of as the essential component of meals and the community, to 'drink of the same cup' is a theological allegory to intimate spiritual union. In its various local usages, wine is always taken with the bread, usually poured over it or used for dipping as with Prosphora.

==== Wheat ====
As the corollary to bread, wheat is very frequently seen in Orthodox services as well. Though it does not hold nearly as central a place theologically or in use, it is seen as a symbol of resurrection and rebirth because a grain of wheat must be buried in the earth, 'die' and then be 'born again' with new growth and life. Because of this it is often seen in prayers for the dead; in the Greek and Russian tradition Koliva is a boiled wheat dish eaten at the end of a service for a deceased person. In Serbian tradition wheat Zito is served at Slava.

==== Water ====
As wheat is to bread, so water is to wine or even more so because it holds a much more prominent position and use and theology. Wine in the Eastern Orthodox Church, as in early Christian history, is always mixed with water for the Eucharist. It is associated with cleansing of the soul and thus the Holy Spirit and Baptism.

Besides its use in Baptism, holy water, specially blessed by a priest, is used extensively for many sanctification purposes and is usually sprinkled on objects. At certain services, particularly at Theophany, a special holy water, known as Theophany water is consecrated and partaken of during the service by each member of the congregation in turn. Theophany water is blessed twice: on the eve of the feast it is blessed in the narthex of the church (the place where baptisms take place), and then the next morning, on the day of the feast, after Divine Liturgy, an outside body of water is blessed, demonstrating the sanctification of all creation which in Eastern Orthodox theology was accomplished by Christ's incarnation, death and resurrection. Later, the priest visits the homes of all of the faithful, and blesses their homes with this Theophany water.

== Daily services ==
=== Historical development ===
Because the Rite of Constantinople evolved as a synthesis of two distinct rites — cathedral rite of Constantinople called the "asthmatiki akolouthia" ("sung services") and the monastic typicon of the Holy Lavra of Saint Sabbas the Sanctified near Jerusalem — its offices are highly developed and quite complex.

=== Local variations ===
Two main strata exist in the rite, those places that have inherited the traditions of the Russian Church which had been given only the monastic Sabbaite typicon which she uses to this day (Note: Тvпико́нъ сіесть уста́въ (The Typicon which is the Order), p 1) in parishes and cathedrals as well as in monasteries, and everywhere else where some remnant of the cathedral rite remained in use; therefore, the rite as practiced in monasteries everywhere resembles the Russian recension, while non-Russian non-monastic customs differs significantly. For example, in the Russian tradition, the "all-night vigil" is served in every church on Saturday nights and the eves of feast days (although it may be abridged to be as short as two hours) while elsewhere, it is usual to have matins on the morning of the feast; however, in the latter instance, vespers and matins are rather less abridged but the Divine Liturgy commences at the end of matins and the hours are not read, as was the case in the extinct cathedral rite of Constantinople.

Also, as the rite evolved in sundry places, different customs arose; an essay on some of these has been written by Archbishop Basil Krivoshein and is posted on the web.

=== Liturgical books ===
The Horologion (῾Ωρολόγιον; Church Slavonic: Chasoslov, Часocлoвъ), or Book of Hours, provides the fixed portions of the Daily Cycle of services (Greek: akolouthies, ἀκολουθίες) as used by the Eastern Orthodox and Eastern Catholic churches.

Into this fixed framework, numerous moveable parts of the service are inserted. These are taken from a variety of liturgical books:

- Psalter (Greek: Ψαλτήρ(ιον), Psalter(ion); Slavonic: Ѱалтырь or Ѱалтирь, Psaltyr' ) A book containing the 150 Psalms (Note: There is also a Psalm 151 which is often included in the Psalter, though it is not actually chanted during the Divine Services.) divided into 20 sections called Kathismata together with the 9 Biblical canticles which are chanted at Matins; although these canticles had been chanted in their entirety, having over time come to be supplemented by interspersed hymns (analogously to stichera) to form the Canon, the canticles themselves are now only regularly used in a few large monasteries (Note: excepting in the Russian tradition where they are used weekly on weekdays of Great Lent.) The Psalter also contains the various "selected psalms", each composed of verses from a variety of psalms, sung at matins on feast days, as well as tables for determining which Kathismata are to be read at each service; in addition to the Psalms read at the daily offices, all the Psalms are read each week and, during Great Lent, twice a week.
- Octoechos (Greek: Ὀκτώηχος; Slavonic: Октоихъ, Oktoikh or Осмогласникъ, Osmoglasnik)—Literally, the Book of the "Eight Tones" or modes. This book contains a cycle of eight weeks, one for each of the eight echoi (church modes of the Byzantine musical system of eight modes), providing texts for each day of the week for Vespers, Matins, Compline, and (on Sundays) the Midnight Office. The origins of this book go back to compositions by St. John Damascene.
- Menaion (Greek: Μηναίον; Slavonic: Минїѧ, Miniya)—A twelve-volume set which provides liturgical texts for each day of the calendar year, (Note: On non-leap years, the service for 29 Feb. (St. John Cassian) is chanted at Compline on 28 Feb.) printed as 12 volumes, one for each month of the year. (Note: The liturgical year begins in September, so the volumes are numbered from 1 for September to 12 for August.) Another volume, the General Menaion contains propers for each class of saints for use when the propers for a particular saint are not available. Additionally, locally venerated saints may have services in supplemental volumes, pamphlets, or manuscripts.
- Menologion A collection of the lives of the saints and commentaries on the meaning of feasts for each day of the calendar year, also printed as 12 volumes, appointed to be read at the meal in monasteries and, when there is an all-night vigil for a feast day, between vespers and matins.
- Triodion (Greek: Τριῴδιον, Triodion; Slavonic: Постнаѧ Трїѡдь, Postnaya Triod' ; Romanian: Triodul), also called the Lenten Triodion. The Lenten Triodion contains propers for:
  - the Pre-Lenten Season
  - the Forty Days of Great Lent itself
  - Lazarus Saturday and Palm Sunday
  - Holy Week
- Pentecostarion (Greek: Πεντηκοστάριον, Pentekostarion; Slavonic: Цвѣтнаѧ Трїѡдь, Tsvetnaya Triod' , literally "Flowery Triodon"; Romanian: Penticostar) This volume contains the propers for the period from Pascha to the Sunday of All Saints. This period can be broken down into the following periods:
  - Bright Week (Easter Week) Commencing with matins on Pascha (Easter Sunday) through the following Saturday
  - Paschal Season—The period from Thomas Sunday until Ascension
  - Ascension and its Afterfeast
  - Pentecost and its Afterfeast
  - All Saints Sunday (the Sunday after Pentecost)
- Synaxarion (Greek: Συναξάριον; Romanian: Sinaxar)—The Synaxarion contains for each day of the year brief lives of the saints and meanings of celebrated feasts, appointed to be read after the Kontakion and Oikos at Matins.
- Irmologion (Greek: ῾Ειρμολόγιον; Slavonic: Ирмологий, Irmologii)—Contains the Irmoi chanted at the Canon of Matins and other services.
- Priest's Service Book (Greek: ῾Ἱερατικόν, Ieratikon; Slavonic: Слѹжебникъ, Sluzhebnik) Contain the portions of the services which are said by the priest and deacon and is given to a deacon and to a priest with his vestments at ordination. (Note: Originally, the deacon's book and the priest's books were distinct, but upon the invention of printing, it was found more practical to combine them.)
- Bishop's Service Book (Greek: Ἀρχιιερατικόν Archieratikon, Slavonic: Чиновникъ, Chinovnik) the portions of the services which are said by the Bishop; for the Canonical Hours, this differs little from what is in the Priest's Service Book.
- Gospel Book (Greek: Ευαγγέλιον, Evangelion) Book containing the 4 Gospels laid out as read at the divine services. (Note: In Greek editions the Evangélion is laid out in order of the cycle of readings as they occur in the ecclesiastical year, with a section in the back providing the Gospel readings for Matins, Feasts and special occasions. In the Slavic usage, the Evangélion contains the four gospels in canonical order (Matthew, Mark, Luke, John) with annotations in the margin to indicate the beginning and ending of each reading (and an index in the back). The Apostól is likewise edited, the Slavonic Apostól having all of the books of the New Testament (excluding the Gospels and Apocalypse) in their entirety, though not in the same order they are found in most English Bibles (Acts is placed first, followed by the Catholic Epistles, etc.).)
- Apostle Book (Greek: Απόστολος, Apostolos; Slavonic: Апостолъ, Apostol) Contains the readings for the Divine Liturgy from the Acts of the Apostles and the Epistles together with the Prokeimenon and Alleluia verses that are chanted with the readings.
- Patristic writings Many writings from the Church fathers are prescribed to be read at matins and, during Great Lent, at the hours; in practice, this is only done in some monasteries and frequently therein the abbot prescribes readings other than those in the written rubrics. therefore it is not customary to enumerate all the volumes required for this.
- Collections (Greek: Ανθολόγιον, Anthologion; Slavonic: Сборникъ, Sbornik) There are numerous smaller anthologies available (Note: For instance, the Festal Menaion contains only those portions of the Menaion that have to do with the Great Feasts; and the General Menaion, et cetera.) which were quite common before the invention of printing but still are in common use both because of the enormous volume of a full set of liturgical texts and because the full texts have not yet been translated into several languages currently in use.
- Typicon (Greek: Τυπικόν, Typikon; Slavonic: Тѵпико́нъ, Typikon or уста́въ, ustav) Contains all of the rules for the performance of the Divine Services, giving directions for every possible combination of the materials from the books mentioned above into the Daily Cycle of Services.

=== Liturgical cycles ===
Various cycles of the liturgical year influence the manner in which the materials from the liturgical books (above) are inserted into the daily services:

==== Weekly Cycle ====
Each day of the week has its own commemoration:

- Sunday—Resurrection of Christ
- Monday—The Holy Angels
- Tuesday—St. John the Forerunner
- Wednesday—The Cross and the Theotokos
- Thursday—The Holy Apostles and St. Nicholas
- Friday—The Cross
- Saturday—All Saints (Note: Including, especially, the Theotokos and the Patron Saint of the local church or monastery.) and the departed

Most of the texts come from the Octoechos, which has a large collections of hymns for each weekday for each of the eight tones; during Great Lent and, to a lesser degree, the pre-lenten season, the Lenten Triodion supplements this with hymns for each day of the week for each week of that season, as does the Pentecostarion during the pascal season. Also, there are fixed texts for each day of the week are in the Horologion and Priest's Service Book (e.g., dismissals) and the Kathismata (selections from the Psalter) are governed by the weekly cycle in conjunction with the season.

==== Fixed Cycle ====
Commemorations on the Fixed Cycle depend upon the day of the calendar year, and also, occasionally, specific days of the week that fall near specific calendar dates, e.g., the Sunday before the Exaltation of the Cross. The texts for this cycle are found in the Menaion.

==== Paschal Cycle ====
The commemorations on the Paschal Cycle (Moveable Cycle) depend upon the date of Pascha (Easter). The texts for this cycle are found in the Lenten Triodion, the Pentecostarion, the Octoechos and also, because the daily Epistle and Gospel readings are determined by this cycle, the Gospel Book and Apostle Book. The cycle of the Octoechos continues through the following Great Lent, so the variable parts of the lenten services are determined by both the preceding year's and the current year's dates of Easter.

===== 8 Week Cycle of the Octoechos =====
The cycle of the eight Tones is found in the Octoechos and is dependent on the date of Easter and commences with the Sunday after (eighth day of) Easter, that week using the first tone, the next week using the second tone, and so, repeating through the week preceding the subsequent Palm Sunday. (Note: Each day of Bright Week (Easter Week) uses propers in a different tone, Sunday: Tone One, Monday: Tone Two, skipping the grave tone (Tone Seven)) The tone of any Sunday and its following week can be calculated by dividing the number of Sundays after Pascha by 8. The remainder is the tone, and a remainder of 0 is Tone 8.

===== 11 Week Cycle of the Matins Gospels =====
The portions of each of the Gospels from the narration of the Resurrection through the end are divided into eleven readings which are read on successive Sundays at matins; there are hymns sung at Matins that correspond with that day's Matins Gospel. This is known as the eothinon cycle. The eothinon also dictates the exapostalaria and doxasticon at lauds. The cycle begins on the first Sunday after Pentecost (All Saint's Sunday), and ends on the fifth sunday of Great Lent (Sunday of St. Mary of Egypt). The cycle only applies to Sundays; it is not referenced any other day. The ethoinon cycle is irregular between Pascha and Pentecost: none on Pascha itself; Thomas Sunday is 1; the Sunday of the Myrrh-bearers is 4; the Sunday of the Paralyzed Man is 5; the Sunday of the Samaritan Woman is 7; the Sunday of the Blind man is 10, the Sunday of the 1st ecumenical council is 10, and Pentecost is none. When a Great Feast of the Lord (class I) falls on a Sunday, the eothinon Gospel and hymns are not used. However, as with the tone cycle, the eothinon still advances, so the cycle is not broken. The eothinon of any Sunday can be calculated by dividing the number of Sundays after Pentecost by 11; the remainder is the eothinon. A remainder of 0 is Eothinon 11.

=== Daily cycle of services ===
The Daily Cycle begins with Vespers (Note: In accordance with Old Testament practice, the day is considered to begin in the evening (Genesis 1:5).) and proceeds throughout the night and day according to the following table:

Name of service in Greek	Name of service in English	Historical time of service	Theme (Note: Sokolof, pp 36–38)
Esperinos (Ἑσπερινός)	Vespers	At sunset	Glorification of God, the Creator of the world and its Providence
Apodepnon (Ἀπόδειπνον)	Compline	At bedtime	Sleep as the image of death, illumined by Christ's Harrowing of Hell after His death
Mesonyktikon (Μεσονυκτικόν)	Midnight Office	At midnight	Christ's midnight prayer in Gethsemane; a reminder to be ready for the Bridegroom coming at midnight and the Last Judgment
Orthros (Ὄρθρος)	Matins or Orthros	Morning watches, ending at dawn	The Lord having given us not only daylight but spiritual light, Christ the Savior
Prote Ora (Πρῶτη Ὥρα)	First Hour (Prime)	At ~6 AM	Christ's being brought before Pilate.
Trite Ora (Τρίτη Ὥρα)	Third Hour (Terce)	At ~9 AM	Pilate's judgement of Christ and the descent of the Holy Spirit at Pentecost, which happened at this hour.
Ekte Ora (Ἕκτη Ὥρα)	Sixth Hour (Sext)	At noon	Christ's crucifixion, which happened at this hour
Ennate Ora (Ἐννάτη Ὥρα)	Ninth Hour (None)	At ~3 PM	Christ's death which happened at this hour.
Typica (τυπικά) or Pro-Liturgy (Note: Sokolof, p 93)	Typica	follows sixth or ninth hour	.

The Typica is served whenever the Divine Liturgy is not celebrated at its usual time, i.e., when there is a vesperal Liturgy or no Liturgy at all. On days when the Liturgy may be celebrated at its usual hour, the Typica follows the sixth hour (or matins, where the custom is to serve the Liturgy then) and the Epistle and Gospel readings for the day are read therein; (Note: The Typica has a certain correspondence to the Missa Sicca of the Mediaeval West.) otherwise, on aliturgical days or when the Liturgy is served at vespers, the Typica has a much shorter form and is served between the ninth hour and vespers.

Also, there are Inter-Hours for the First, Third, Sixth and Ninth Hours. These are services of a similar structure to, but briefer than, the hours. their usage varies with local custom, but generally they are used only during the Nativity Fast, Apostles Fast, and Dormition Fast on days when the lenten alleluia replaces "God is the Lord" at matins, which may be done at the discretion of the ecclesiarch when the Divine Liturgy is not celebrated.

In addition to these public prayers, there are also private prayers prescribed for both monastics and laypersons; in some monasteries, however, these are read in church. These include Morning and Evening Prayers and prayers (and, in Russia, canons) to be prayed in preparation for receiving the Eucharist.

The full cycle of services are usually served only in monasteries, cathedrals, and other katholika. In monasteries and parishes of the Russian tradition, the Third and Sixth Hours are read during the Prothesis ( Liturgy of Preparation); otherwise, the Prothesis is served during matins, the final portion of which is omitted, the Liturgy of the Catechumens commencing straightway after the troparion following the Great Doxology.

The Midnight Office is seldom served in parishes churches except at the Paschal Vigil as the essential office wherein the burial shroud is removed from the tomb and carried to the altar.

=== Aggregates ===
The sundry Canonical Hours are, in practice, grouped together into aggregates (Note: Sokolof, p 36) so that there are three major times of prayer a day: Evening, Morning and Midday. (Note: This is to conform with Psalm 55:17, "Evening, morning, and noonday will I tell of it and will declare it, and He will hear my voice.") The most common groupings are as follows:

==== Ordinary days ====
- Evening — Ninth Hour, Vespers, Compline (Note: In monasteries, when there is an evening meal, compline is often separated from vespers and read after the meal; in Greek (απόδειπνον/apodeipnon) and Slavonic (Повечерiе/Pov'echeriye), the name for Compline literally means, "After-supper.")
- Morning Watches — Midnight Office, (Note: Midnight Office is often omitted in parish churches.) Matins, First Hour
- Morning — Third Hour, Sixth Hour, and the Divine Liturgy or Typica (Note: Though the Liturgy (and Typica) are not, strictly speaking, a part of the daily cycle of services, their placement is fixed by the Typicon in relation to the daily cycle.)

==== Weekdays during lent ====
- Evening — Great Compline
- Morning Watches — Midnight Office, Matins, First Hour
- Morning — Third Hour, Sixth Hour, Ninth Hour, Typica, Vespers (sometimes with the Liturgy of the Presanctified Gifts or, on the Annunciation, the Liturgy of Saint John Chrysostom)

==== When there is an all-night vigil ====
On the eves before Great Feasts and, in some traditions, on all Sundays, this grouping is used. However, the all-night vigil is usually abridged so as to not last literally "all-night" and may be as short as two hours; on the other hand, on Athos and in the very traditional monastic institutions, that service followed by the hours and Liturgy may last as long as 18 hours.

- Afternoon — Ninth Hour, Little Vespers, (Note: This is an abbreviated, redundant Vespers) Compline (where it is not read at the commencement of the Vigil)
- Early night — Compline (where it is not the custom for it to follow small vespers), Great Vespers, (Note: On great feast days proceeded by a strict fast (Christmas, Epiphany, and Annunciation on a weekday), the Vigil commences with Great Compline rather than Vespers) a reading, Matins, First Hour

==== When the royal hours are read ====
- Evening — Ninth Hour, Vespers, Compline
- Morning Watches — Midnight Office, Matins
- Morning — First, Third, Sixth, and Ninth Hours and the Typica

==== On the eves of Christmas, Theophany, and Annunciation ====
When the feast is a weekday (or, in the Russian tradition, on any day for Christmas, Theophany), Vespers (with the Liturgy in most instances) is served earlier in the day and so Great Compline functions much as Great vespers does on the vigils of other feast days.

- Evening — Great Compline (in some traditions) and, if there be an All-Night Vigil, the reading, matins, first hour.
- Morning Watches — (unless there be an all-night vigil) midnight office, matins, first hour.

== The Divine Liturgy ==
The Divine Liturgy is the Sunday worship service of the Eastern Orthodox Church. There are several forms of the liturgy: the Divine Liturgy of St. John Chrysostom, Liturgy of St. Basil, Liturgy of St. Mark, Liturgy of St. James, Liturgy of St. Gregory the Great, Liturgy of St. Tikhon of Moscow, and the Liturgy of the Presanctified Gifts. The Divine Liturgy begins with the exclamation from the priest, "Blessed is the kingdom of the Father and of the Son and of the Holy Spirit, now and ever and unto ages of ages." The assembled faithful respond, "Amen." The service begins with the Great Litany, so called because it is longer than most litanies and its petitions touch on the needs of the world: peace and salvation, the church, her bishops, her faithful, captives and their health and salvation, deliverance from anger and need. It is concluded, as with most litanies, by calling to the remembrance of the faithful the witness of the Theotokos and the saints. In light of that powerful witness, the faithful are charged to commend their lives to Our Lord Jesus Christ. A closing prayer is exclaimed by the priest. The Troparia, Kontakia, and Antiphons follow in eight different very moving melodic tones.

Then, the Rite of Proclamation begins with the Trisagion. The rite of proclamation, the Epistle readings and Gospel are chanted by the Priest, Deacons, and Readers. The service continues with the Litany of Fervent Supplication, Litany of the Departed, and Litany of the Catachumens. The Liturgy of the Faithful follows with the Cherubic Hymn which is sometimes done kneeling then there is the Great Entrance of the Eucharistic Gifts and procession. The doors of the altar are the venerated and the gifts are presented before the faithful. Then everyone proclaims the faith through chanting the Nicene Creed.

Afterward, the celebration of the Great Anaphora Eucharistic Prayer is recited over the Eucharistic Gifts as moving chants are sung by the congregants. After this prayer, the climax of the liturgy, the priest asks the Holy Spirit to consecrate the gifts and turn them into the Body and Blood of Christ. The faithful then receive communion. Having invoked the Holy Spirit and consecrated the gifts, the priest commemorates the saints, beginning with the Theotokos. At this point, the assembled faithful chant the ancient hymn in honour of the Virgin Mary. In the Divine Liturgy of St. John Chrysostom the Axion Estin follows as: "It is truly meet to bless you, O Theotokos, ever-blessed and most pure, and the Mother of our God. More honorable than the cherubim, beyond compare more glorious than the seraphim, without corruption you gave birth to God, the Word. True Theotokos, we magnify you." The Lord's Prayer is also chanted. After consecrating the gifts, commemorating the saints, and praying for the local bishop, the priest lifts up the consecrated gifts, exclaiming, "The holy things are for the holy!" To which the faithful respond, "One is holy, one is Lord, Jesus Christ, to the glory of God the Father, amen." This phrase unfortunately loses something in English, since we have two words for holy and saint. In most other languages, this dialogue has a connotation of, "The holy things are for the saints! / Only one is a saint! Only one is Lord: Jesus Christ...." This is a rather prominent reminder that our holiness finds its source in God alone, and particularly in our participation in this communion.

The faithful communicate in Orthodox tradition by receiving in both kinds (bread intincted in the wine) from a spoon, a tradition which dates to the fourth century. Having received the body and blood of the Savior, they take a piece of antidoron. In Russian tradition, a small cup of wine is also offered.

After a dismissal common to the services of the church, the faithful come forward to venerate the cross and leave the church. Renewed by the eucharistic meal, they are sent forth as witnesses to Christ in the world.

== See also ==
- Ectenia
