= Royal Hours =

Religious celebration

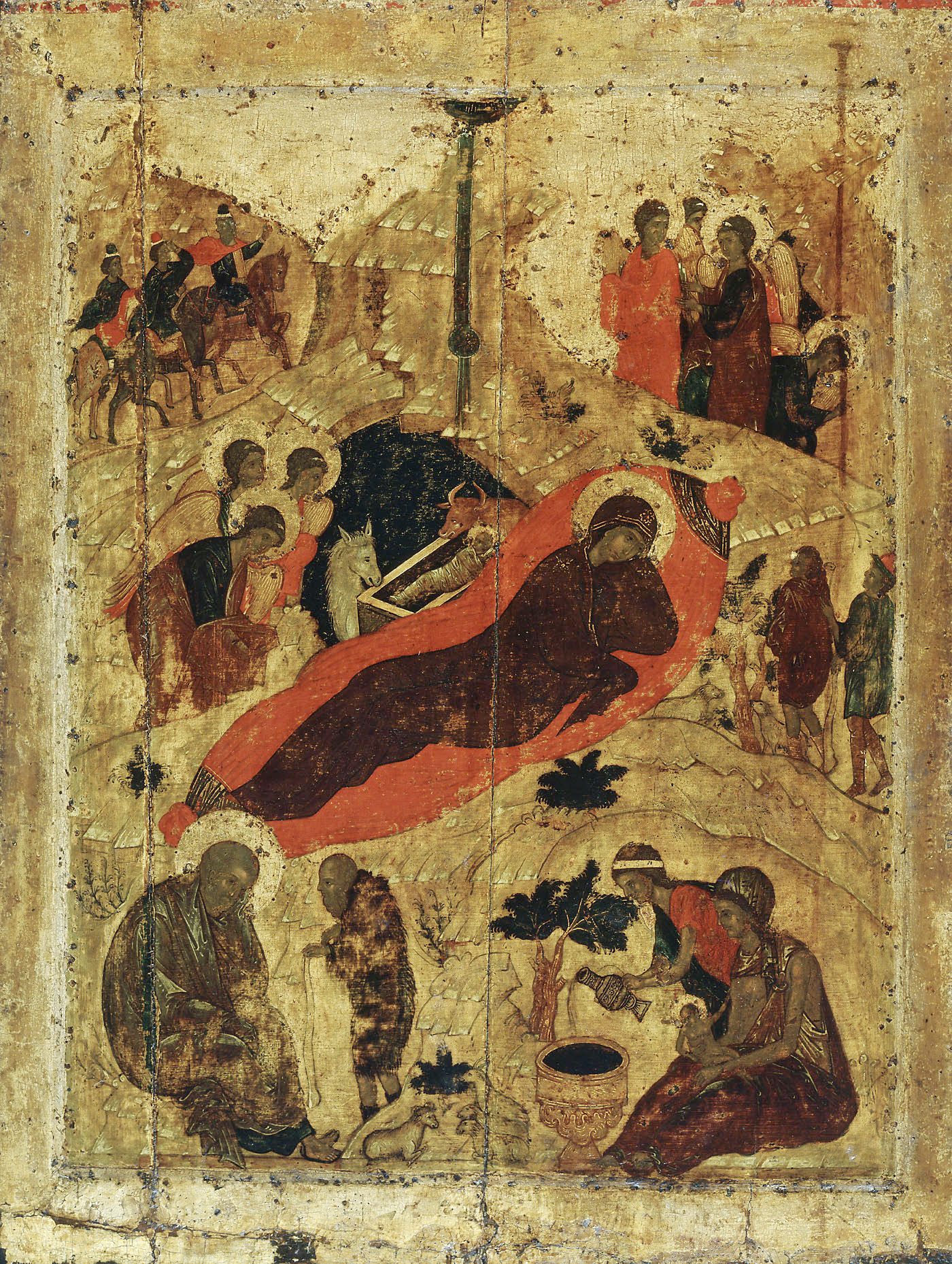
Nativity of the Lord, Icon by St. Andrei Rublev (1405), Cathedral of the Annunciation, Moscow Kremlin

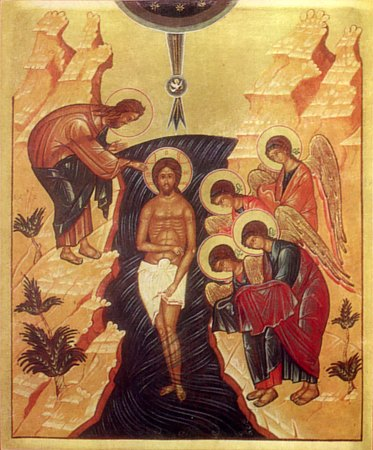
Icon of the Theophany of the Lord

The Royal Hours, also called the Great Hours or the Imperial Hours, are a particularly solemn celebration of the Little Hours in the Eastern Orthodox and the Eastern Catholic Churches of the Byzantine Rite. The Royal Hours are celebrated only three times a year: on the Eve of the Nativity, the Eve of Theophany, (Note: If the Eve of Nativity or Theophany falls on Saturday or Sunday, the Royal Hours are chanted on the preceding Friday, and on that Friday it is not permitted to celebrate the Divine Liturgy.) and Great Friday.

This service takes its name from the fact that it used to be officially attended by the Emperor and his court at Hagia Sophia in Constantinople. Because of the presence of the Emperor, there was a special singing of "Many Years" to the Emperor, the Imperial Court, and the Hierarchy. This singing of "Many Years" continues to this day (in modified form) in cathedrals and monasteries. By his presence, the Emperor acknowledged his submission to Christ the true King.

The three holy days on which the Royal Hours are celebrated were chosen as days in the church year which most particularly demonstrate Jesus' kenosis (self-emptying), and thus His true royal majesty.

According to Sacred Tradition, the Royal Hours of Great Friday were composed by St. Cyril (378 - 444), Patriarch of Alexandria.

Although the Royal Hours are splendid, they are also penitential. On days when the Royal Hours are celebrated it is not permitted to celebrate the Divine Liturgy. (Note: The Divine Liturgy which is celebrated later on the same day is actually a Vesperal Liturgy; so, liturgically speaking, the next day has actually begun before the Liturgy is celebrated.)

The Royal Hours are an aggregate of five services, all served together as one:

- First Hour
- Third Hour
- Sixth Hour
- Ninth Hour
- Typica

For the Royal Hours, the priest vests in Epitrachelion (Note: In the Russian Practice, the priest also wears the Epimanikia.) and Phelonion, and the deacon vests fully in Sticharion, Orarion and Epimanikia. The Holy Doors and Curtain are open for most of the service, and the Gospel Book is placed on an analogion (lectern) in the center of the Temple (church). At the beginning of each Hour the priest or deacon censes the Gospel, Icons and people.

When it is time to begin the First Hour, the bell is rung in the usual manner (blagovest). At the beginning of each of the succeeding Hours, the bell is struck the number of times that corresponds to the Hour (i.e., three times at the beginning of the Third Hour, six times at the beginning of the Sixth Hour, nine times at the beginning of the Ninth Hour). At the beginning of the Typica the bell is struck twelve times.

At each of the Hours, one of the three fixed Psalms is replaced by a Psalm that is significant to the Feast being celebrated; the Troparion and Kontakion of the day are replaced by numerous hymns chanted by the choir; and each Hour has an Old Testament reading, a Prokeimenon, and an Epistle and Gospel.

There was a service of Royal Hours for Pentecost composed by the priest Nicholas Malaxus (fl. c. 1538), and published in 1568. This service, however, has not come to wide usage in the Church.
