= Little Hours =

Christian minor canonical hours

In Christianity, the Little Hours or minor hours are a subset of the canonical hours. The minor are those celebrated between Lauds and Vespers; they consist of Terce, Sext, Nones, and Compline. The minor hours, so called because their structure is shorter and simpler than that of the major hours, are celebrated at intervals between the major hours as a means of sanctifying the various stages of daylight and the workday.

== History ==
From the time of the early Church, the practice of seven fixed prayer times have been taught; in Apostolic Tradition, Hippolytus instructed Christians to pray seven times a day "on rising, at the lighting of the evening lamp, at bedtime, at midnight" and "the third, sixth and ninth hours of the day, being hours associated with Christ's Passion." This has given rise to the practice of praying the canonical hours at seven fixed prayer times. The canonical hours are found in a book known as a breviary.

== Western Christian practice ==
According to ancient tradition, Christians also used to offer private prayers at various times during the day, in order to imitate the Apostolic Church. Over time, this gave rise to various liturgical celebrations. The liturgy of both East and West retained the Terce, Sext, and None of these hours, primarily because these hours are associated with the commemoration of the Passion of Christ and the first preaching of the Gospel. These prayer times derive from ancient Jewish practice and are mentioned in the Acts of the Apostles. They also commemorate the events of the Passion of Jesus.

Chalcedonian monks later added Prime, held at the first hour of daylight. Prime has been suppressed in the Latin rite after the Second Vatican Council because it was seen as a duplication of Lauds. However, it has been preserved in the Liturgy of the Hours of the Carthusians and in some contemplative monasteries.

In English, the other three hours celebrated between morning and evening prayer are now in the ICEL four-volume edition of the Liturgy of the Hours called midmorning, midday and midafternoon prayer, and collectively the daytime hours; and in the three-volume edition in use in most English-speaking countries outside of the United States they are indicated as before noon, midday and afternoon, and collectively as prayer during the day.

Celebration of the three hours of Terce, Sext and None is in general obligatory for those who lead a contemplative life. For others, recitation of all three is recommended and, in order to preserve the tradition of praying during the day's work, those who have the duty to celebrate the Liturgy of the Hours are obliged to say at least one. The Latin collective term is hora media.

All three have the same structure. They begin with the versicle Deus in adiutorium meum intende and its response, followed by Gloria Patri and (except in Lent) Alleluia. A hymn is then said or sung, after which come the psalmody (three psalms or portions of psalms, together with their antiphons), and a short reading, followed by a versicle and a prayer. Two psalmodies are provided: one that varies from day to day for use by all, and a complementary one, with psalms chosen mainly from among the gradual psalms, for use by those who say one or two additional hours.

== Eastern Rite practice ==
The text of the fixed portions of the Little Hours as used by Eastern Orthodox and Eastern Catholics of Byzantine Rite is found in the Horologion. At the Little Hours, the majority of the Office is read (actually a simple recitative—never just said with the normal speaking voice) by the reader alone, with very few variable parts. Those parts which are variable are the Troparion and Kontakion of the day. Structurally, the Little Hours are related to Compline and the Midnight Office. The structure and propers of the Little Hours are governed by the Typicon. The Little Hours are normally not read individually, but are usually aggregated with other services. The priest normally vests only in Epitrachelion (stole) and, in the Slavic practice, Epimanikia (cuffs). The Holy Doors and Curtain on the Iconostasis remain closed. The deacon does not normally serve the Little Hours.

In the Syriac Orthodox Church and the Indian Orthodox Church (two denominations in Oriental Orthodox Christianity) these fixed prayer times are known as 3rd hour prayer (Tloth sho`in [9 am]), 6th hour prayer (Sheth sho`in [12 pm]), and 9th hour prayer (Tsha' sho`in [3 pm]).

=== Structure ===
The structure of all of the Little Hours is the same:

- The usual beginning
- Three Psalms (these are fixed for the particular Hour, and do not vary from day to day)
- Troparia (one or two, depending upon the day), and a Theotokion that is proper to the Hour
- A brief Psalm verse
- Trisagion and the Lord's Prayer
- Kontakion
- Lord, have mercy (40 times)
- Prayer of the Hours
- Concluding prayers
- Dismissal by the Priest

=== Lenten Seasons ===
During Great Lent, the Little Hours undergo significant changes on weekdays, and are celebrated with greater solemnity than during the rest of the year. On weekdays, in addition to the normal three Psalms, a kathisma from the psalter is read, the choir chants special Lenten hymns in place of the Troparion and Kontakion of the day, and the Sixth Hour has added to it a special Troparion (called the "Troparion of the Prophecy"), Prokeimena, and a reading from the Old Testament (Joel and Zechariah during Cheesefare Week, Isaiah during the Forty Days of Great Lent, Ezekiel during Holy Week). (In monasteries, it is traditional to add a reading from the Ladder of Divine Ascent at the Third, Sixth, and Ninth Hours.) Finally, as at all Lenten services, the Prayer of St. Ephraim is read with everyone making prostrations.

During Holy Week, on Monday, Tuesday and Wednesday, the services are similar to those during Great Lent (including the reading of Kathismata), except that instead of the normal Lenten hymns which replace the Kontakion, the Kontakion of the day (i.e., that day of Holy Week) is chanted. Also, the four Gospels are read in their entirety (stopping at John 13:32) over the course of these three days at the Third Hour, Sixth Hour, and Ninth Hour. On Great Thursday, Friday and Saturday, the Little Hours are more like normal, except that a Troparion of the Prophecy, prokeimena, and a reading from Jeremiah are chanted at the First Hour on Great Thursday. On Great Friday, the Royal Hours are chanted (see below).

During the Lesser Lenten seasons (Nativity Fast, Apostles' Fast and Dormition Fast) the Little Hours undergo changes similar to those during Great Lent, except the hymns are usually read instead of chanted, and there are no additional Kathismata on weekdays. In addition, on weekdays of the Lesser Fasts, the Inter-Hours (Greek: Mesoria) will be read. These Inter-Hours follow the same general outline as the Little Hours, except they are shorter, one Inter-Hour following each of the Little Hours.

=== Festal Seasons ===
The Royal Hours are the most liturgically splendid celebration of the Little Hours. This service takes its name from the fact that it used to be officially attended by the Emperor and his court at Hagia Sophia in Constantinople. Three times a year, on the Eve of the Nativity, Eve of Theophany, and Good Friday, the Little Hours are celebrated (together with the Typica) as one continuous service. The priest vests in Phelonion (chasuble), and the deacon vests fully and serves. The holy doors and curtain are open for most of the service, and the gospel book is placed on an analogion (lectern) in the center of the temple. At the beginning of each Hour the priest or deacon censes the Gospel, Icons and people. At each of the Hours, one of the three fixed Psalms is replaced by a Psalm that is significant to the Feast being celebrated; the Troparion and Kontakion of the day are replaced by numerous hymns chanted by the choir; and each Hour has an Old Testament reading, a Prokeimenon, and an Epistle and Gospel.

The Paschal Hours are celebrated during Bright Week (Easter Week), and are the most joyous of the entire year. At this time the Little Hours are completely different from any other time of the year. Everything is sung joyfully rather than being read. Each of the Little Hours is exactly the same: No Psalms are read; rather, each Paschal Hour is composed of hymns taken primarily from the Paschal Vigil. On the Sunday of Pascha (Easter) itself, the priest vests fully, as for Divine Liturgy; on the other days of Bright week, he wears Epitrachelion, Epimanikia and Phelonion. The Holy Doors and Curtain are open (as they will be for the entire Bright Week).

== See also ==
- Matins or Office of Readings, Lauds, Vespers.
- Nocturns and Vigil (liturgy)
- Royal Hours
