= Anthologion =

Christian liturgical text

An Anthologion, or Anthologue, is an Eastern Christian liturgical text or book, similar to the Roman breviary, that has been in use among Eastern Orthodox Christians, and to some extent, Eastern Catholics.

The Anthologion contains the daily divine offices with hymns addressed to Jesus Christ, the Theotokos, and principal saints among Eastern Christians. Other common offices include those of prophets, apostles, martyrs, pontiffs, monasitcs, and confessors, according to the Byzantine rite.

It is called, in Greek, "άνθολόγιον", lit. 'a collection of flowers'.

A modern Anthologion published by St. Ignatius Orthodox Press contains the Horologion, with Lenten and Paschal variants, the Psalter, Octoechos, General and Festal Menaion, selections from the Triodion and Pentecostarion, general prayers, preparation for Holy Communion and Confession. According to the publisher, this book is "[s]uitable for use individually or with a group, this monumental book aims to fill the place that the Breviary or Liturgy of the Hours fills for Western Christians: offering the full daily office of prayer in a slightly simplified form, with texts for special feast days and seasons. It is a prayer library in a single book."

== See also ==
- Anthology
- Florilegium
