= Canonical hours =

Christian concept of periods of prayer throughout the day

The canonical hour of vespers according to the Evangelical-Lutheran tradition at Vadstena Abbey Church, Sweden

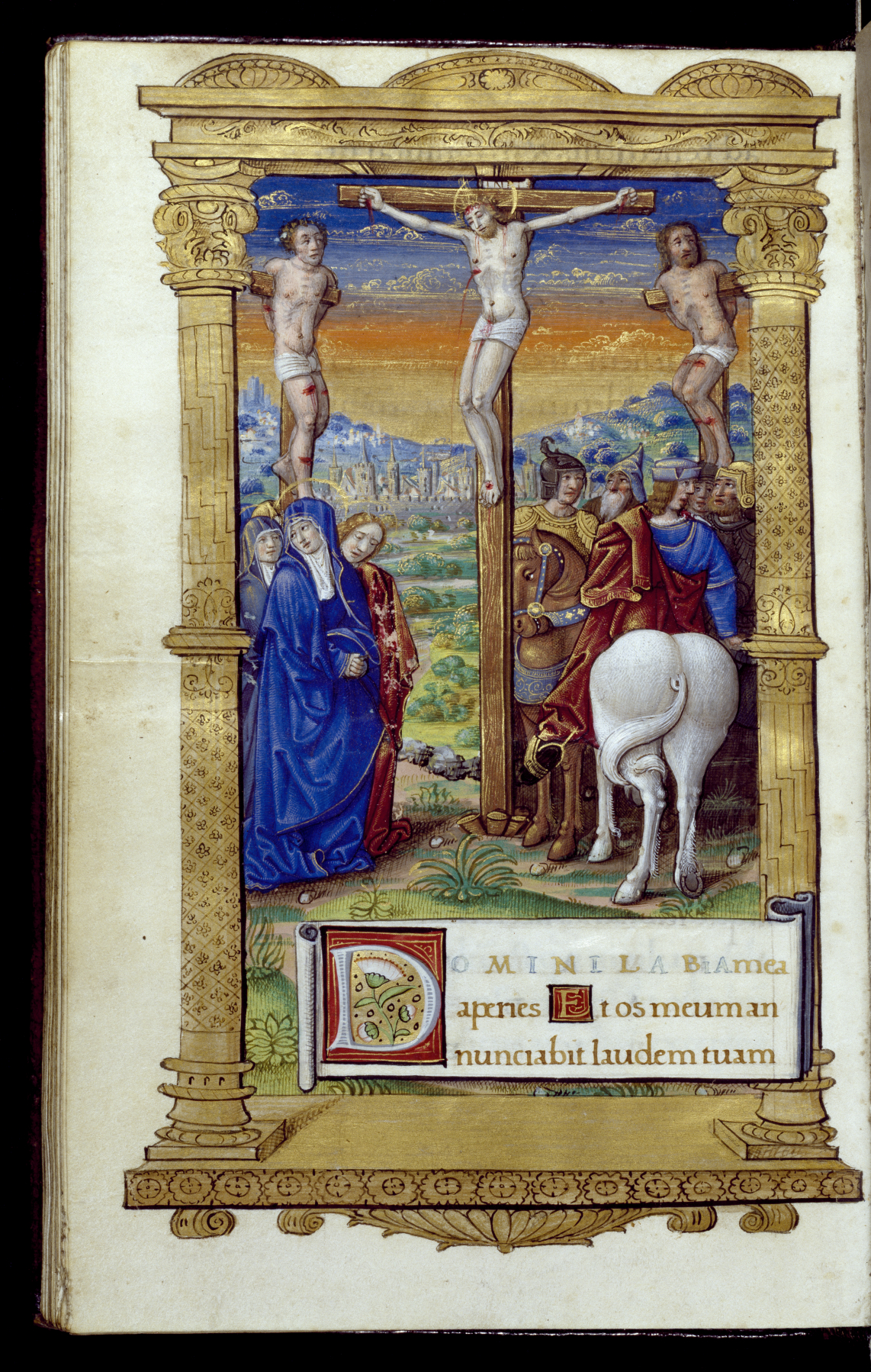
Opening verse from a Book of Hours Domine labia mea aperies et os meum annuntiabit laudem tuam, c. 1520

In the practice of Christianity, canonical hours mark the divisions of the day in terms of fixed times of prayer at regular intervals. A book of hours, chiefly a breviary, normally contains a version of, or selection from, such prayers.

In the Roman Rite of the Catholic Church, canonical hours are also called officium, since it refers to the official prayer of the Church, which is known variously as the officium divinum ("divine service", "divine office", or "divine duty"), and the opus Dei ("work of God"). The current official version of the hours in the Roman Rite is called the Liturgy of the Hours (Latin: liturgia horarum) or divine office.

In Lutheranism and Anglicanism, they are often known as the daily office or divine office, to distinguish them from the other "offices" of the Church (e.g. the administration of the sacraments).

In the Eastern Orthodox and Byzantine Catholic Churches, the canonical hours may be referred to as the divine services, and the book of hours is called the horologion (Greek: Ὡρολόγιον). Despite numerous small differences in practice according to local custom, the overall order is the same among Byzantine Rite monasteries, although parish and cathedral customs vary rather more so by locale.

The usage in Oriental Orthodox Churches, the Assyrian Church of the East, and their Eastern Catholic and Eastern Lutheran counterparts varies based on the rite, for example the East Syriac Rite or the Byzantine Rite.

== Development ==
=== Judaism and the early church ===
The canonical hours stemmed from Jewish prayer. In the Old Testament, God commanded the Israelite priests to offer sacrifices of animals in the morning and afternoon (Exodus 29:38–39). Eventually, these sacrifices moved from the Tabernacle to Solomon's Temple in Jerusalem.

During the Babylonian captivity, when the Temple was no longer in use, synagogues carried on the practice, and the services (at fixed hours of the day) of Torah readings, psalms, and hymns began to evolve. This "sacrifice of praise" began to be substituted for the sacrifices of animals. After the people returned to Judea, the prayer services were incorporated into Temple worship as well.

The miraculous healing of the crippled beggar described in Acts of the Apostles 3:1, took place as Peter and John went to the Temple for the three o'clock hour of prayer. The practice of daily prayers grew from the Jewish practice of reciting prayers at set times of the day known as zmanim: for example, in the Acts of the Apostles, Saint Peter and John the Evangelist visit the Temple in Jerusalem for the afternoon prayers.

Psalm 119:164 states: "Seven times a day I praise you for your righteous laws" (of this, Symeon of Thessalonica writes that "the times of prayer and the services are seven in number, like the number of gifts of the Spirit, since the holy prayers are from the Spirit"). In Act 10:9, the decision to include Gentiles among the community of believers, arose from a vision Peter had while praying about noontime.

Early Christians prayed the Psalms (Acts 4:23–30), which have remained the principal part of the canonical hours. By AD 60, Didache was recommending that disciples pray the Lord's Prayer three times a day; this practice found its way into the canonical hours as well. By the second and third centuries, such prominent Christian writers as Clement of Alexandria, Origen, and Tertullian wrote of the practice of Morning and Evening Prayer, and of the prayers at the third, sixth and ninth hours.

From the time of the early Church, the practice of seven fixed prayer times, being attached to Psalm 119:164, have been taught; in Apostolic Tradition, Hippolytus instructed Christians to pray seven times a day "on rising, at the lighting of the evening lamp, at bedtime, at midnight" and "the third, sixth and ninth hours of the day, being hours associated with Christ's Passion."

In the early church, during the night before every feast, a vigil was kept. The word "Vigils", at first applied to the Night Office, comes from a Latin source, namely the Vigiliae or nocturnal watches or guards of the soldiers. The night from six o'clock in the evening to six o'clock in the morning was divided into four watches or vigils of three hours each, the first, the second, the third, and the fourth vigil. The Night Office is linked to Psalm 119:62: "At midnight I will rise to give thanks unto thee because of thy righteous judgments."

Christians attended two liturgies on the Lord's Day, worshipping communally in both a morning service and evening service, with the purpose of reading the Scriptures and celebrating the Eucharist. Throughout the rest of the week, Christians assembled at the church every day for morning prayer (which became known as lauds) and evening prayer (which became known as vespers), while praying at the other fixed prayer times privately. In the evening the faithful assembled in the place or church where the feast was to be celebrated and prepared themselves by prayers, readings, and sometimes also by hearing a sermon. Pliny the Younger (63 – c. 113) mentions not only fixed times of prayer by believers, but also specific services—other than the Eucharist—assigned to those times: "they met on a stated day before it was light, and addressed a form of prayer to Christ, as to a divinity ... after which it was their custom to separate, and then reassemble, to eat in common a harmless meal." (cf. Lovefeast) This vigil was a regular institution of Christian life and was defended and highly recommended by St. Augustine and St. Jerome.

The Office of the Vigils was a single Office, recited without interruption at midnight. Probably in the fourth century, in order to break the monotony of this long night prayer the custom of dividing it into three parts or Nocturns was introduced. John Cassian in speaking of the solemn Vigils mentions three divisions of this Office.

Around the year 484, the Greek-Cappadocian monk Sabbas the Sanctified began the process of recording the liturgical practices around Jerusalem, while the cathedral and parish rites in the Patriarchate of Constantinople evolved in an entirely different manner. The two major practices were synthesized, commencing in the 8th century, to yield an office of great complexity.

In 525, Benedict of Nursia set out one of the earliest schemes for the recitation of the Psalter at the Office. The Cluniac Reforms of the 11th century renewed an emphasis on liturgy and the canonical hours in the reformed priories of the Order of Saint Benedict, with Cluny Abbey at their head.

=== Middle Ages ===
As the form of fixed-hour prayer developed in the Christian monastic communities in the East and West, the Offices grew both more elaborate and more complex, but the basic cycle of prayer still provided the structure for daily life in monasteries. By the fourth century, the elements of the canonical hours were more or less established. For secular (non-monastic) clergy and lay people, the fixed-hour prayers were by necessity much shorter, though in many churches, the form of the fixed-hour prayers became a hybrid of secular and monastic practice (sometimes referred to as 'cathedral' and 'monastic' models).

==== Byzantine Rite ====
In the Byzantine Empire, the development of the Divine Services shifted from the area around Jerusalem to Constantinople. In particular, Theodore the Studite (c. 758 – c. 826) combined a number of influences from the Byzantine court ritual with monastic practices common in Anatolia, and added thereto a number of hymns composed by himself and his brother Joseph (see typikon for further details).

==== Western rites ====
In the West, the Rule of Saint Benedict of Nursia (written in 516) was modeled on his guidelines for the prayers on the customs of the basilicas of Rome. It was he who expounded the concept in Christian prayer of the inseparability of the spiritual life from the physical life. St. Benedict set down the dictum Ora et labora – "Pray and work". The Order of Saint Benedict began to call the prayers the Opus Dei or "Work of God".

By the time of Saint Benedict, author of the Rule, the monastic Liturgy of the Hours was composed of seven daytime hours and one at night. He associated the practice with Psalm 118/119:164, "Seven times a day I praise you", and Psalm 118/119:62, "At midnight I rise to praise you". The fixed-hour prayers came to be known as the "Divine Office" (office coming from 'officium', lit., "duty").

Initially, the term "Matins" from Latin matutinus, meaning "of or belonging to the morning", was applied to the psalms recited at dawn. At first "Lauds" (i.e. praises) derived from the three last psalms in the office (148, 149, 150), in all of which the word laudate is repeated frequently, and to such an extent that originally the word Lauds designated the end, that is to say, these three psalms with the conclusion. The Night Office and Lauds are grouped together as a single canonical hour to form a total of seven canonical hours.

By the fourth century the word "matins" became attached to the prayer originally offered at cockcrow. and, according to the sixth-century Rule of Saint Benedict, could be calculated to be the eighth hour of the night (the hour that began at about 2 a.m.). Outside of monasteries few rose at night to pray. The canonical hour of the vigil was said in the morning, followed immediately by lauds, and the name of "matins" replaced that of "vigils". Gradually the title "Lauds" was applied to the early morning office.

Already well-established by the 9th century in the West, these canonical hours consisted of daily prayer liturgies:

- Matins (nighttime) with Lauds (early morning)
- Prime (first hour of daylight)
- Terce (third hour)
- Sext (noon)
- None (ninth hour)
- Vespers (sunset evening)
- Compline (end of the day)

The three major hours were Matins, Lauds and Vespers; the minor hours were Terce, Sext, None and Compline.

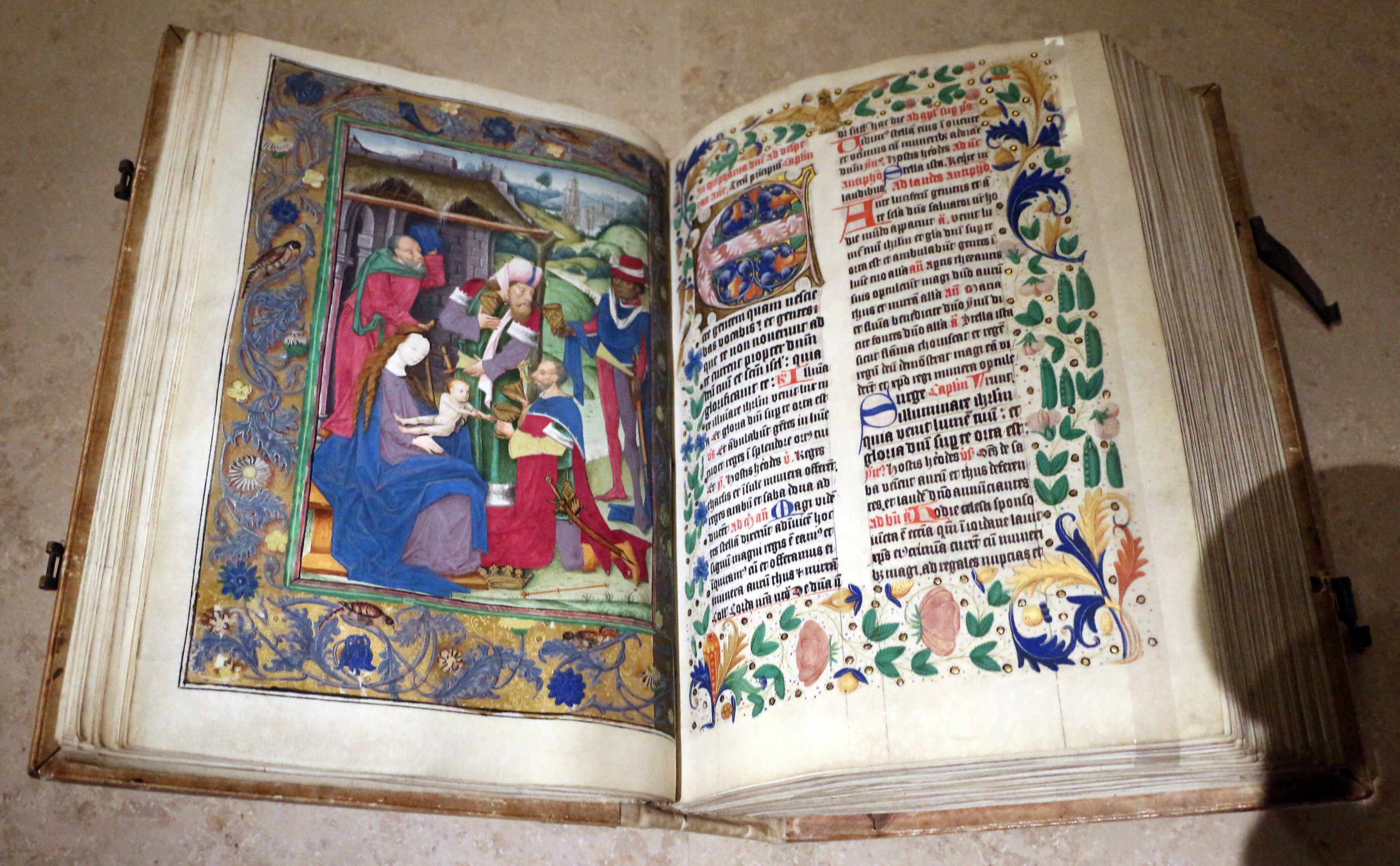
Breviary of Beatrice van Assendelft, 1485

As the Divine Office grew more important in the life of the Church, the rituals became more elaborate. Praying the Office already required various books, such as a Psalter for the psalms, a lectionary to find the assigned Scripture reading for the day, a Bible to proclaim the reading, a hymnal for singing, etc. As parishes grew in the Middle Ages away from cathedrals and basilicas, a more concise way of arranging the hours was needed. So, a sort of list developed called the breviary, which gave the format of the daily office and the texts to be used.

The spread of breviaries eventually reached Rome, where Pope Innocent III extended their use to the Roman Curia. The Franciscans sought a one-volume breviary for their friars to use during travels, so the order adopted the Breviarium Curiae, but substituting the Gallican Psalter for the Roman. The Franciscans gradually spread this breviary throughout Europe. Eventually, Pope Nicholas III adopted the widely used Franciscan breviary to be the breviary used in Rome. By the 14th century, the breviary contained the entire text of the canonical hours.

In general, when modern secular books reference canonical hours in the Middle Ages, these are the equivalent times:

- Vigil (eighth hour of night: 2 a.m.)
- Matins (a later portion of Vigil, from 3 a.m. to dawn)
- Lauds (dawn; approximately 5 a.m., but varies seasonally)
- Prime (early morning, the first hour of daylight, approximately 6 a.m.)
- Terce (third hour, 9 a.m.)
- Sext (sixth hour, noon)
- None (ninth hour, 3 p.m.)
- Vespers (sunset, approximately 6 p.m.)
- Compline (end of the day before retiring, approximately 7 p.m.)

Church bells are tolled at the fixed times of these canonical hours in some Christian traditions as a call to prayer.

== Roman Rite ==
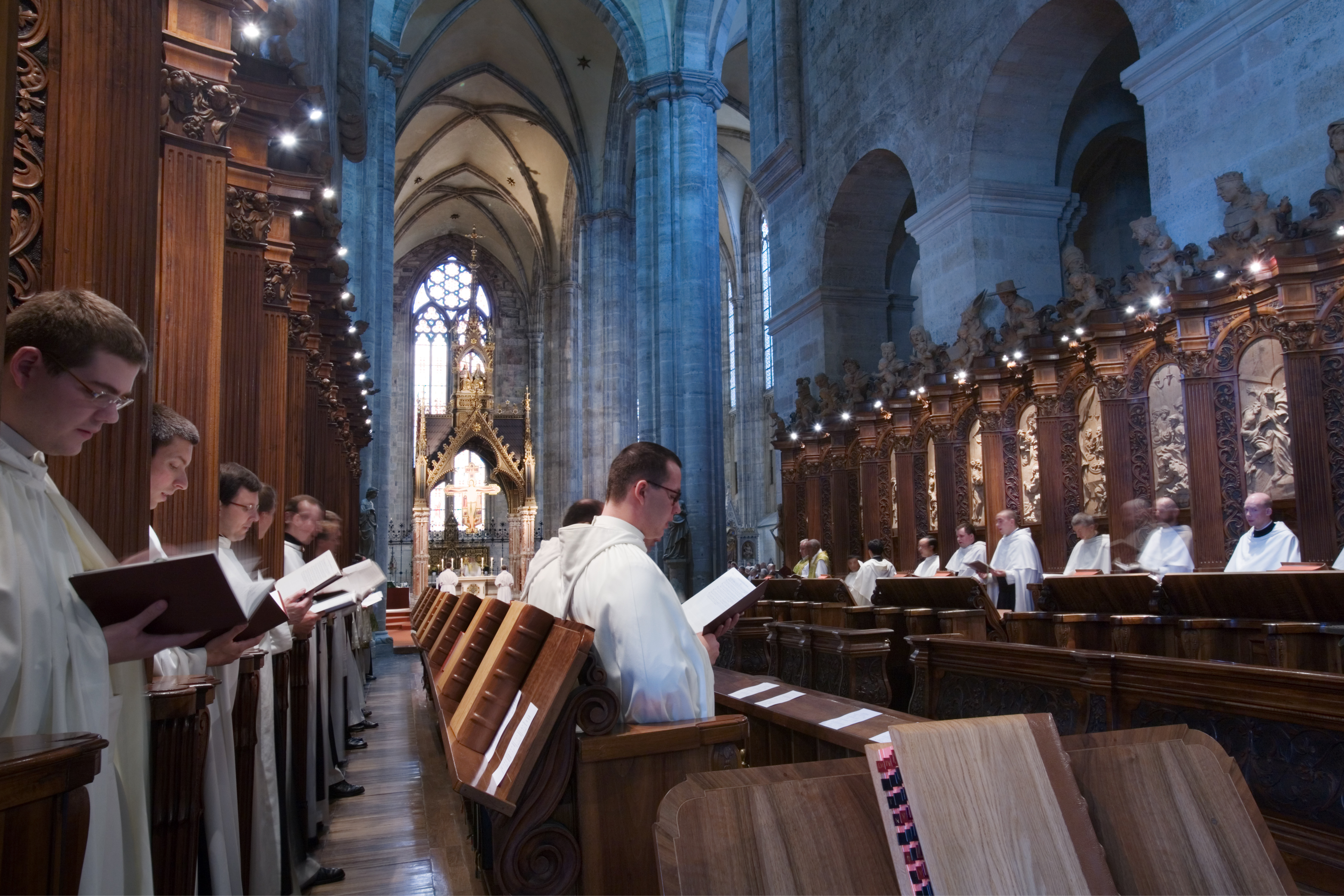
Cistercians singing the Liturgy of the Hours at Heiligenkreuz Abbey

In the Latin Church of the Catholic Church, bishops, priests, deacons and the members of the consecrated life are obliged to recite the hours each day, keeping as far as possible to the true time of day, and using the text of the approved liturgical books that apply to them. The laity are encouraged to recite the prayer of the hours.

=== Diurnal offices ===
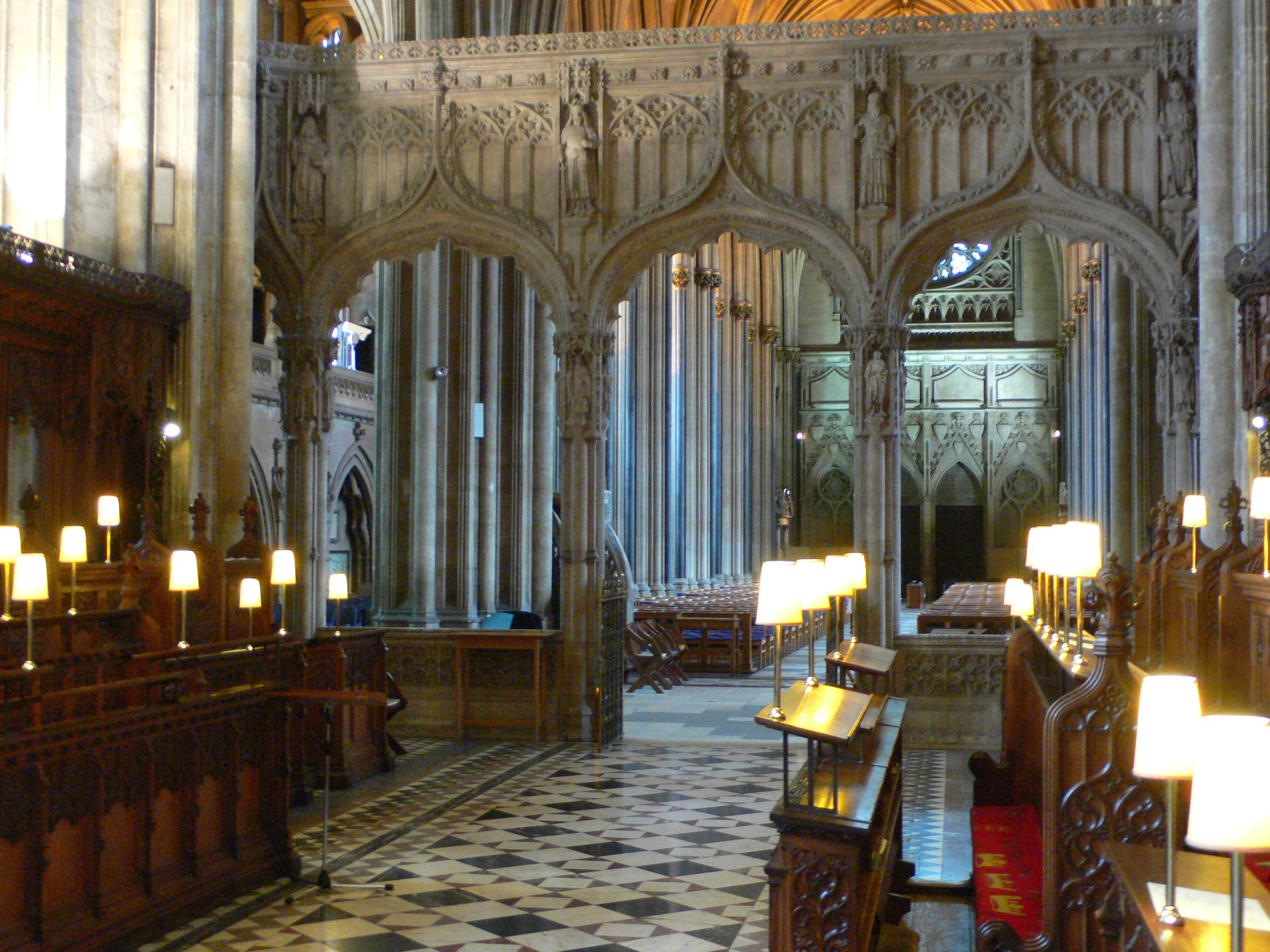
Traditionally, monastic communities pray the Divine Office in the choir of the church.

The diurnal offices or daytime offices (Ecclesiastical Latin: horae diurnae) are the canonical hours during the day. Interpretation of their number and identity varies.

The monastic rule drawn up by Benedict of Nursia (c. 480 – c. 547) distinguishes between the seven daytime canonical hours of lauds (dawn), prime (sunrise), terce (mid-morning), sext (midday), none (mid-afternoon), Vespers (sunset), compline (retiring) and the nighttime canonical hour of vigil. It links the seven daytime offices with Psalm 118/119:164 ("Seven times a day I praise you for your righteous rules"), and the one nighttime office with Psalm 118/119:62 ("At midnight I rise to praise you, because of your righteous rules").

In this reckoning, the one nocturnal office, together with Lauds and Vespers, are the three major hours; the other five are the minor or little hours.

According to Dwight E. Vogel, Daniel James Lula and Elizabeth Moore the diurnal offices are Terce, Sext, and None, which are distinguished from the major hours of Matins, Lauds and Vespers and from the nighttime hours of Compline and Vigil.

=== Revisions ===
The Council of Trent, in its final session on 4 December 1563, entrusted the reform of the Breviary to the Pope. On 9 July 1568, Pope Pius V, the successor of the pope who closed the Council of Trent, promulgated an edition, known as the Roman Breviary, with his Apostolic Constitution Quod a nobis, imposing it in the same way in which, two years later, he imposed his Roman Missal. Later popes altered the Roman Breviary of Pope Pius V. Pope Pius XII began reforming the Roman Breviary, allowing use of a new translation of the psalms and establishing a special commission to study a general revision, with a view to which all the bishops were consulted in 1955. His successor, Pope John XXIII, made a further revision in 1960.

=== Second Vatican Council revisions ===
Following the Second Vatican Council, the Catholic Church's Roman Rite simplified the observance of the canonical hours and sought to make them more suited to the needs of today's apostolate and accessible to the laity, hoping to restore their character as the prayer of the entire Church.

The council abolished the office of Prime, and envisioned a manner of distributing the psalms over a period of more than 1 week. The Roman breviary is published under the title Liturgia Horarum. A translation is published by Catholic Book Publishing Corp. under the title The Liturgy of the Hours in four volumes, arranged according to the seasons of the liturgical year.

The current liturgical books for the celebration of the hours in Latin are those of the editio typica altera (second typical edition) promulgated in 1985. The official title is Officium Divinum, Liturgia Horarum iuxta Ritum Romanum, editio typica altera.

==== Official English translations ====
- The Divine Office is translated by a commission set up by the Episcopal Conferences of England and Wales, Australia and Ireland. First published in 1974 by HarperCollins, this edition is the English edition approved for use the above countries, as well as many Asian and African dioceses.
- Catholic Truth Society published Prayer During the Day in 2009.
- The Liturgy of the Hours is translated by the International Commission on English in the Liturgy (ICEL). First published in 1975 by Catholic Book Publishing Company in the US, this edition is the English edition approved for use in the US, Canada and several other English-speaking dioceses.

=== Current practice ===
After the Second Vatican Council, which decided that the hour of Prime should be suppressed, as it was perceived as duplicating Lauds, Pope Paul VI decreed a new arrangement of the Liturgy of the Hours. It has, however, been revived in the Daily Office prayed by the Personal Ordinariate of Our Lady of Walsingham and the Personal Ordinariate of Our Lady of the Southern Cross.

The major hours consist of the Matins (or Office of Readings), Lauds and Vespers. The character of Lauds is that of praise, of Vespers, that of thanksgiving. The Office of Readings has the character of reflection on the day that is past and preparing the soul for its passage to eternal life. In each office, the psalms and canticle are framed by antiphons.

== Byzantine Rite usage ==
=== Historical development ===
Because the Rite of Constantinople evolved as a synthesis of two distinct rites—cathedral rite of Constantinople called the "asmatiki akolouthia" ("sung services") and the monastic typicon of the Holy Lavra of Saint Sabbas the Sanctified near Jerusalem—its offices are highly developed and quite complex.

=== Local variations ===
Two main strata exist in the rite, those places that have inherited the traditions of the Russian Church which had been given only the monastic sabbaite typicon which is used to this day in parishes and cathedrals as well as in monasteries, and everywhere else where some remnant of the cathedral rite remained in use; therefore, the rite as practiced in monasteries everywhere resembles the Russian recension, while non-Russian non-monastic customs differs significantly. For example, in the Russian tradition, the "all-night vigil" is served in every church on Saturday nights and the eves of feast days (although it may be abridged to be as short as two hours) while elsewhere, it is usual to have Matins on the morning of the feast; however, in the latter instance, Vespers and matins are rather less abridged but the Divine Liturgy commences at the end of matins and the hours are not read, as was the case in the extinct cathedral rite of Constantinople.

Also, as the rite evolved in sundry places, different customs arose; an essay on some of these has been written by Archbishop Basil Krivoshein and is posted on the web.

=== Liturgical books ===
The Horologion (῾Ωρολόγιον; Church Slavonic: Часocлoвъ, Chasoslov), or Book of Hours, provides the fixed portions of the Daily Cycle of services (akolouthies, ἀκολουθίες) as used by the Eastern Orthodox and Eastern Catholic churches.

Into this fixed framework, numerous moveable parts of the service are inserted. These are taken from a variety of liturgical books:

- Psalter (Greek: Ψαλτήρ(ιον), "Psalter(ion)"; Slavonic: Ѱалтырь or Ѱалтирь, "Psaltyr") A book containing the 150 Psalms (Note: There is also a Psalm 151 which is often included in the Psalter, though it is not actually chanted during the Divine Services.) divided into 20 sections called Kathismata together with the nine Biblical canticles which are chanted at Matins; although these canticles had been chanted in their entirety, having over time come to be supplemented by interspersed hymns (analogously to stichera) to form the Canon, the canticles themselves are now only regularly used in a few large monasteries. (Note: excepting in the Russian tradition where they are used weekly on weekdays of Great Lent.) The Psalter also contains the various "selected psalms", each composed of verses from a variety of psalms, sung at matins on feast days, as well as tables for determining which Kathismata are to be read at each service; in addition to the Psalms read at the daily offices, all the Psalms are read each week and, during Great Lent, twice a week.
- Octoechos (Greek: Ὀκτώηχος; Slavonic: Октоихъ, Oktoikh or Осмогласникъ, Osmoglasnik)—Literally, the Book of the "Eight Tones" or modes. This book contains a cycle of eight weeks, one for each of the eight echoi (church modes of the Byzantine musical system of eight modes), providing texts for each day of the week for Vespers, Matins, Compline, and (on Sundays) the Midnight Office. The origins of this book go back to compositions by St. John Damascene.
- Menaion (Greek: Μηναίον; Slavonic: Минїѧ, Miniya)—A twelve-volume set which provides liturgical texts for each day of the calendar year, (Note: On non-leap years, the service for 29 Feb (St. John Cassian) is chanted at Compline on 28 Feb.) printed as 12 volumes, one for each month of the year. (Note: The liturgical year begins in September, so the volumes are numbered from 1 for September to 12 for August.) Another volume, the General Menaion contains propers for each class of saints for use when the propers for a particular saint are not available. Additionally, locally venerated saints may have services in supplemental volumes, pamphlets, or manuscripts.
- Menologion A collection of the lives of the saints and commentaries on the meaning of feasts for each day of the calendar year, also printed as 12 volumes, appointed to be read at the meal in monasteries and, when there is an all-night vigil for a feast day, between Vespers and Matins.
- Triodion (Greek: Τριῴδιον, Triodion; Slavonic: Постнаѧ Трїѡдь, Postnaya Triod; Romanian: Triodul), also called the Lenten Triodion. The Lenten Triodion contains propers for:
  - the Pre-Lenten Season
  - the Forty Days of Great Lent itself
  - Lazarus Saturday and Palm Sunday
  - Holy Week
- Pentecostarion (Greek: Πεντηκοστάριον, Pentekostarion; Slavonic: Цвѣтнаѧ Трїѡдь, Tsvetnaya Triod, literally "Flowery Triodon"; Romanian: Penticostar) This volume contains the propers for the period from Pascha to the Sunday of All Saints. This period can be broken down into the following periods:
  - Bright Week (Easter Week) Commencing with matins on Pascha (Easter Sunday) through the following Saturday
  - Paschal Season—The period from Thomas Sunday until Ascension
  - Ascension and its Afterfeast
  - Pentecost and its Afterfeast
  - All Saints Sunday (the Sunday after Pentecost)
- Synaxarion (Greek: Συναξάριον; Romanian: Sinaxar)—The Synaxarion contains for each day of the year brief lives of the saints and meanings of celebrated feasts, appointed to be read after the Kontakion and Oikos at Matins.
- Irmologion (Greek: ῾Ειρμολόγιον; Slavonic: Ирмологий, Irmologii)—Contains the Irmoi chanted at the Canon of Matins and other services.
- Priest's Service Book (Greek: ῾Ἱερατικόν, Ieratikon; Slavonic: Слѹжебникъ, Sluzhebnik)—Contain the portions of the services which are said by the priest and deacon and is given to a deacon and to a priest with his vestments at ordination. (Note: Originally, the deacon's book and the priest's books were distinct, but upon the invention of printing, it was found more practical to combine them.)
- Bishop's Service Book (Greek: Ἀρχιιερατικόν Archieratikon, Slavonic: Чиновникъ, Chinovnik) the portions of the services which are said by the Bishop; for the Canonical Hours, this differs little from what is in the Priest's Service Book.
- Gospel Book (Greek: Ευαγγέλιον, Evangélion) Book containing the 4 Gospels laid out as read at the divine services. (Note: In Greek editions the Evangélion is laid out in order of the cycle of readings as they occur in the ecclesiastical year, with a section in the back providing the Gospel readings for Matins, Feasts and special occasions. In the Slavic usage, the Evangélion contains the four gospels in canonical order (Matthew, Mark, Luke, John) with annotations in the margin to indicate the beginning and ending of each reading (and an index in the back). The Apostól is likewise edited, the Slavonic Apostól having all of the books of the New Testament (excluding the Gospels and Apocalypse) in their entirety, though not in the same order they are found in most English Bibles (Acts is placed first, followed by the Catholic Epistles, etc.).)
- Apostle Book (Greek: Απόστολος, Apostolos; Slavonic: Апостолъ, Apostol) Contains the readings for the Divine Liturgy from the Acts of the Apostles and the Epistles together with the Prokeimenon and Alleluia verses that are chanted with the readings.
- Patristic writings Many writings from the Church fathers are prescribed to be read at matins and, during great lent, at the hours; in practice, this is only done in some monasteries and frequently therein the abbot prescribes readings other than those in the written rubrics. therefore it is not customary to enumerate all the volumes required for this.
- Collections (Greek: Ανθολόγιον, Anthologion; Slavonic: Сборникъ, Sbornik) There are numerous smaller anthologies available (Note: For instance, the Festal Menaion contains only those portions of the Menaion that have to do with the Great Feasts; and the General Menaion, et cetera.) which were quite common before the invention of printing but still are in common use both because of the enormous volume of a full set of liturgical texts and because the full texts have not yet been translated into several languages currently in use.
- Typicon (Greek: Τυπικόν, Typikon; Slavonic: Тѵпико́нъ, Typikon or уста́въ, ustav) Contains all of the rules for the performance of the Divine Services, giving directions for every possible combination of the materials from the books mentioned above into the Daily Cycle of Services.

=== Liturgical cycles ===
Various cycles of the liturgical year influence the manner in which the materials from the liturgical books (above) are inserted into the daily services:

==== Weekly Cycle ====
Each day of the week has its own commemoration:

- Sunday—Resurrection of Christ
- Monday—The Holy Angels
- Tuesday—St. John the Forerunner
- Wednesday—The Cross and the Theotokos
- Thursday—The Holy Apostles and St. Nicholas
- Friday—The Cross
- Saturday—All Saints (Note: Including, especially, the Theotokos and the Patron Saint of the local church or monastery.) and the departed

Most of the texts come from the Octoechos, which has a large collections of hymns for each weekday for each of the eight tones; during great lent and, to a lesser degree, the pre-lenten season, the Lenten Triodion supplements this with hymns for each day of the week for each week of that season, as does the Pentecostarion during the pascal season. Also, there are fixed texts for each day of the week are in the Horologion and Priest's Service Book (e.g., dismissals) and the Kathismata (selections from the Psalter) are governed by the weekly cycle in conjunction with the season.

==== Fixed Cycle ====
Commemorations on the Fixed Cycle depend upon the day of the calendar year, and also, occasionally, specific days of the week that fall near specific calendar dates, e.g., the Sunday before the Exaltation of the Cross. The texts for this cycle are found in the Menaion.

==== Paschal Cycle ====
The commemorations on the Paschal Cycle (Moveable Cycle) depend upon the date of Pascha (Easter). The texts for this cycle are found in the Lenten Triodion, the Pentecostarion, the Octoechos and also, because the daily Epistle and Gospel readings are determined by this cycle, the Gospel Book and Apostle Book. The cycle of the Octoechos continues through the following Great Lent, so the variable parts of the lenten services are determined by both the preceding year's and the current year's dates of Easter.

===== 8 Week Cycle of the Octoechos =====
The cycle of the eight Tones is found in the Octoechos and is dependent on the date of Easter and commences with the Sunday after (eighth day of) Easter, that week using the first tone, the next week using the second tone, and so, repeating through the week preceding the subsequent Palm Sunday. (Note: Each day of Bright Week (Easter Week) uses propers in a different tone, Sunday: Tone One, Monday: Tone Two, skipping the grave tone (Tone Seven))

===== 11 Week Cycle of the Matins Gospels =====
The portions of each of the Gospels from the narration of the Resurrection through the end are divided into eleven readings which are read on successive Sundays at matins; there are hymns sung at Matins that correspond with that day's Matins Gospel.

=== Daily cycle of services ===
The Daily Cycle begins with Vespers (Note: In accordance with Old Testament practice, the day is considered to begin in the evening (Genesis 1:5).) and proceeds throughout the night and day according to the following table:

Name of service in Greek	Name of service in English	Historical time of service	Theme
(Koine Greek: Ἑσπερινός, romanized: Esperinós)	Vespers	At sunset	Glorification of God, the Creator of the world and His Providence
(Koine Greek: Ἀπόδειπνον, romanized: Apódeipnon)	Compline	At bedtime	Sleep as the image of death, illumined by Christ's Harrowing of Hell after His death
(Koine Greek: Μεσονυκτικόν, romanized: Mesonyktikón)	Midnight Office	At midnight	Christ's midnight prayer in Gethsemane; a reminder to be ready for the Bridegroom coming at midnight and the Last Judgment
(Koine Greek: Ὄρθρος, romanized: Órthros)	Matins or Orthros	Morning watches, ending at dawn	The Lord having given us not only daylight but spiritual light, Christ the Savior
(Koine Greek: Πρῶτη Ὥρα, romanized: Prō̂tē Óra)	First Hour (Prime)	At ~6 am	Christ's being brought before Pilate
(Koine Greek: Τρίτη Ὥρα, romanized: Trítē Óra)	Third Hour (Terce)	At ~9 am	Pilate's judgement of Christ and the descent of the Holy Spirit at Pentecost, which happened at this hour
(Koine Greek: Ἕκτη Ὥρα, romanized: Èktē Óra)	Sixth Hour (Sext)	At noon	Christ's crucifixion, which happened at this hour
(Koine Greek: Ἐννάτη Ὥρα, romanized: Ennátē Óra)	Ninth Hour (None)	At ~3 pm	Christ's death, which happened at this hour
(Koine Greek: τυπικά, romanized: Typicá) or Pro-Liturgy	Typica	follows the sixth or ninth hour	

The Typica is served whenever the Divine Liturgy is not celebrated at its usual time, i.e., when there is a vesperal Liturgy or no Liturgy at all. On days when the Liturgy may be celebrated at its usual hour, the Typica follows the sixth hour (or Matins, where the custom is to serve the Liturgy then) and the Epistle and Gospel readings for the day are read therein; (Note: The Typica has a certain correspondence to the Missa Sicca of the Mediaeval West.) otherwise, on aliturgical days or when the Liturgy is served at vespers, the Typica has a much shorter form and is served between the ninth hour and vespers.

Also, there are Inter-Hours for the First, Third, Sixth and Ninth Hours. These are services of a similar structure to, but briefer than, the hours. their usage varies with local custom, but generally they are used only during the Nativity Fast, Apostles Fast, and Dormition Fast on days when the lenten alleluia replaces "God is the Lord" at matins, which may be done at the discretion of the ecclesiarch when the Divine Liturgy is not celebrated.

In addition to these public prayers, there are also private prayers prescribed for both monastics and laypersons; in some monasteries, however, these are read in church. These include Morning and Evening Prayers and prayers (and, in Russia, canons) to be prayed in preparation for receiving the Eucharist.

The full cycle of services are usually served only in monasteries, cathedrals, and other katholika. In monasteries and parishes of the Russian tradition, the Third and Sixth Hours are read during the Prothesis (Liturgy of Preparation); otherwise, the Prothesis is served during Matins, the final portion of which is omitted, the Liturgy of the Catechumens commencing straightway after the troparion following the Great Doxology.

The Midnight Office is seldom served in parishes churches except at the Paschal Vigil as the essential office wherein the burial shroud is removed from the tomb and carried to the altar.

=== Aggregates ===
The sundry Canonical Hours are, in practice, grouped together into aggregates so that there are three major times of prayer a day: Evening, Morning and Midday. (Note: This is to conform with Psalm 55:17, "Evening, morning, and noonday will I tell of it and will declare it, and He will hear my voice.") The most common groupings are as follows:

==== Ordinary days ====
- Evening – Ninth Hour, Vespers, Compline (Note: In monasteries, when there is an evening meal, compline is often separated from vespers and read after the meal; in Greek (απόδειπνον/apodeipnon) and Slavonic (Повечерiе/Pov'echeriye), the name for Compline literally means, "After-supper".)
- Morning Watches – Midnight Office, (Note: Midnight Office is often omitted in parish churches.) Matins, First Hour
- Morning – Third Hour, Sixth Hour, and the Divine Liturgy or Typica (Note: Though the Liturgy (and Typica) are not, strictly speaking, a part of the daily cycle of services, their placement is fixed by the Typicon in relation to the daily cycle.)

==== Weekdays during lent ====
- Evening – Great Compline
- Morning Watches – Midnight Office, Matins, First Hour
- Morning – Third Hour, Sixth Hour, Ninth Hour, Typica, Vespers (sometimes with the Liturgy of the Presanctified Gifts or, on the Annunciation, the Liturgy of Saint John Chrysostom)

==== When there is an all-night vigil ====
On the eves before Great Feasts and, in some traditions, on all Sundays, this grouping is used. However, the all-night vigil is usually abridged so as to not last literally "all-night" and may be as short as two hours; on the other hand, on Athos and in the very traditional monastic institutions, that service followed by the hours and Liturgy may last as long as 18 hours.

- Afternoon – Ninth Hour, Little Vespers, (Note: This is an abbreviated, redundant Vespers, preserving only the opening Psalm, four 'Lord, I call' verses, 'O Gladsome Light', the Prokimenon, 'Vouchsafe, O Lord', an Aposticha, the Nunc Dimmitis and Trisagion prayers, the troparion and a short litany. On great feast days preceded by a strict fast (see note below), a Vesperal Liturgy is said instead.) Compline (where it is not read at the commencement of the Vigil)
- Early night – Compline (where it is not the custom for it to follow small vespers), Great Vespers, (Note: On great feast days preceded by a strict fast (Christmas, Epiphany, and Annunciation on a weekday), the Vigil commences with Great Compline rather than Vespers, with Vespers preceding Liturgy the previous day) a reading, Matins, First Hour

==== When the royal hours are read ====
- Evening – Ninth Hour, Vespers, Compline
- Morning Watches – Midnight Office, Matins
- Morning – First, Third, Sixth, and Ninth Hours and the Typica

==== On the eves of Christmas, Theophany, and Annunciation ====
When the feast is a weekday (or, in the Russian tradition, on any day for Christmas, Theophany), Vespers (with the Liturgy in most instances) is served earlier in the day and so Great Compline functions much as Great vespers does on the vigils of other feast days.

- Evening – Great Compline (in some traditions) and, if there be an All-Night Vigil, the reading, matins, first hour.
- Morning Watches – (unless there be an all-night vigil) midnight office, matins, first hour.

== Alexandrian Rite ==
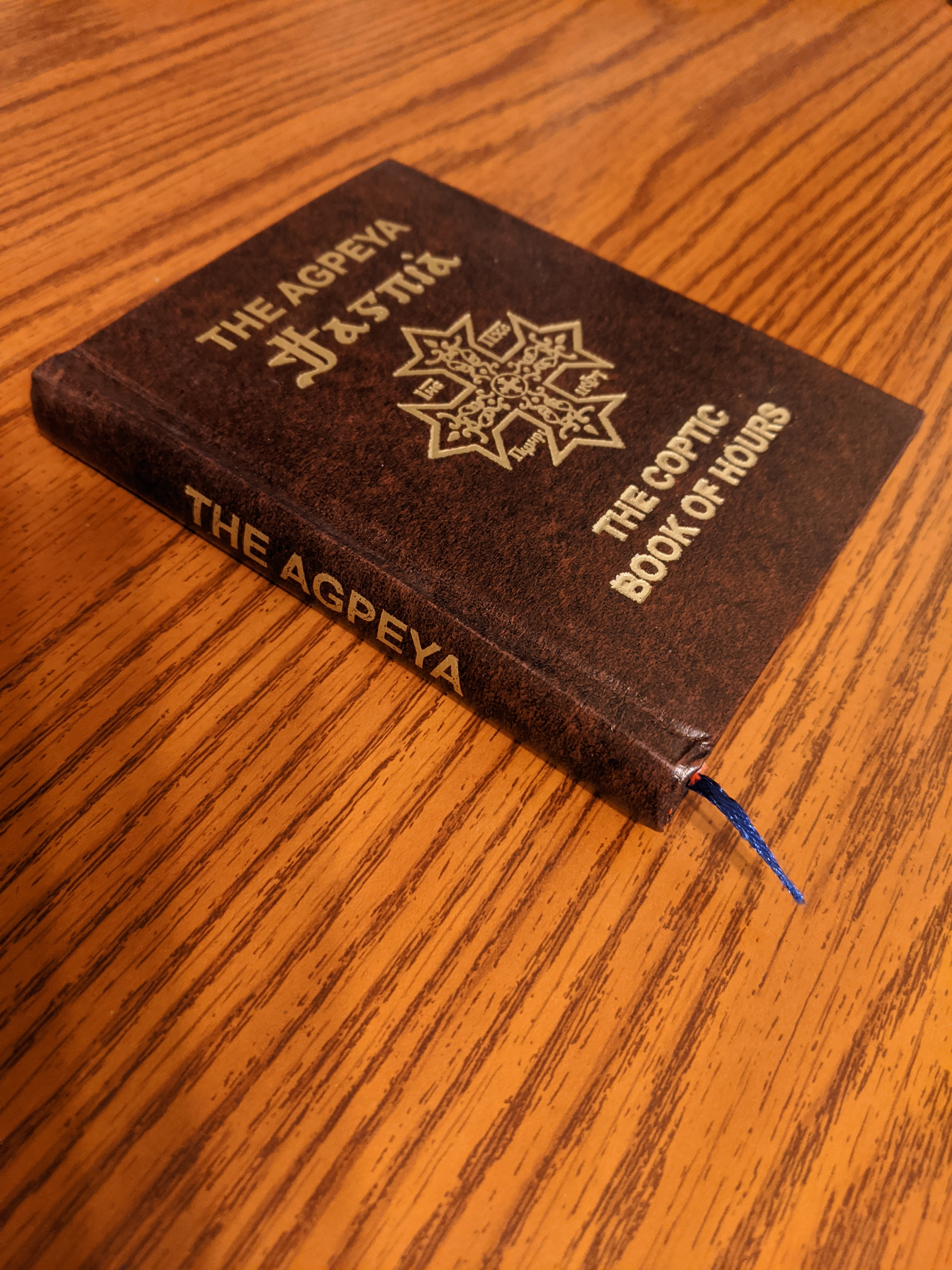
The Agpeya is a breviary used in Oriental Orthodox Christianity to pray the canonical hours at fixed prayer times during the day.

The Alexandrian Rite is observed by the Coptic Orthodox Church of Alexandria and the Coptic Catholic Church. The cycle of canonical hours is largely monastic, primarily composed of psalm readings. The Coptic equivalent of the Byzantine Horologion is the Agpeya.

Seven canonical hours exist, corresponding largely to the Byzantine order, with an additional "Prayer of the Veil" which is said by Bishops, Priests, and Monks (something like the Byzantine Midnight Office).

The hours are chronologically laid out, each containing a theme corresponding to events in the life of Jesus Christ:

- "Midnight Praise" (said in the early morning before dawn) commemorates the Second Coming of Christ. It consists of three watches, corresponding to the three stages of Christ's prayer in the Garden of Gethsemane ( Matthew 25:1–13 ).
- Prime (dawn) is said upon waking in the morning or after the Midnight Praise the previous night. Associated with the Eternity of God, the Incarnation of Christ, and his Resurrection from the dead.
- Terce (9 a.m.) commemorates Christ's trial before Pilate, the descent of the Holy Spirit at Pentecost.
- Sext (noon) commemorates the Passion of Christ.

Terce and Sext are prayed before each Divine Liturgy.

- None (3 p.m.) commemorates the death of Christ on the Cross. This hour is also read during fasting days.
- Vespers (sunset) commemorates the taking down of Christ from the Cross.
- Compline (9 p.m. – before bedtime) commemorates the burial of Christ, the Final Judgment.

Vespers and Compline are both read before the Liturgy during Lent and the Fast of Nineveh.

- The Veil is reserved for bishops, priests and monks, as an examination of conscience.

Every one of the Hours follows the same basic outline:

- Introduction, which includes the Lord's Prayer
- Prayer of Thanksgiving
- Psalm 50 (LXX).
- Various Psalms
- An excerpt from the Holy Gospel
- Short Litanies
- Some prayers (Only during Prime and Compline)
- Lord Have Mercy is then chanted 41 times (representing the 39 lashes Christ received before the crucifixion, plus one for the spear in His side, plus one for the crown of thorns)
- Prayer of "Holy Holy Holy..." and Lord's Prayer
- Prayer of Absolution
- Prayer of Every Hour

== Syriac rites ==
=== East Syriac Rite ===
The East Syriac Rite (also known as the Chaldean, Assyrian, or Persian Rite) has historically been used in Syria, Mesopotamia, Persia, and Malabar. The nucleus of the Daily Office is mainly of course the recitation of the Psalter. There are usually seven regular hours of service; the following are the times of prayer:

- Ramsha (ܪܲܡܫܵܐ) or the Evening Liturgy (6 pm)
- Suba-a (ܣܘܼܒܵܥܵܐ) or the Supper Liturgy (9 pm)
- Lelya (ܠܸܠܝܵܐ) or the Night Liturgy (12 am)
- Qala d-Shahra ( ܩܵܠܵܐ ܕܫܲܗܪܵ ) or the Vigil Liturgy (3 am), a rarely used
- Sapra (ܨܲܦܪܵܐ) or the Morning Liturgy (6 am)
- Quta'a (ܩܘܼܛܵܥܵܐ) or the Third Hour Liturgy (9 am)
- Eddana (ܥܸܕܵܢܵܐ) or the Noon Liturgy (12 pm)

When East Syriac monasteries existed (which is no longer the case) seven hours of prayer were the custom in them, and three hulali (sections) of the Psalter were recited at each service. This would accomplish the unique feat of the common recitation of the entire Psalter each day.

The present arrangement provides for seven hulali at each ferial night service, ten on Sundays, three on "Memorials", and the whole Psalter on Feasts of the Lord. At the evening service there is a selection of from four to seven psalms, varying with the day of the week, and also a Shuraya, or short psalm, with generally a portion of Psalm 118, varying with the day of the fortnight. At the morning service the invariable psalms are 109, 90, 103:1–6, 112, 92, 148, 150, 116. On ferias and "Memorials" Psalm 146 is said after Psalm 148, and on ferias Psalm 1:1–18, comes at the end of the psalms.

The rest of the services consist of prayers, antiphons, litanies, and verses (giyura) inserted—like the Greek stichera, but more extensively—between verses of psalms. On Sundays the Gloria in Excelsis and Benedicte are said instead of Psalm 146. Both morning and evening services end with several prayers, a blessing, (Khuthama, "Sealing" ), the kiss of peace, and the Creed.

The variables, besides the psalms, are those of the feast or day, which are very few, and those of the day of the fortnight. These fortnights consist of weeks called "Before" (Qdham) and "After" (Wathar), according to which of the two choirs begins the service. Hence the book of the Divine Office is called Qdham u wathar, or at full length Kthawa daqdham wadhwathar, the "Book of Before and After".

The East Syriac liturgical Calendar is unique. The year is divided into periods of about seven weeks each, called Shawu'i; these are Advent (called Subara, "Annunciation"), Epiphany, Lent, Easter, the Apostles, Summer, "Elias and the Cross", "Moses", and the "Dedication" (Qudash idta). "Moses" and the "Dedication" have only four weeks each. The Sundays are generally named after the Shawu'a in which they occur, "Fourth Sunday of Epiphany", "Second Sunday of the Annunciation ", etc., though sometimes the name changes in the middle of a Shawu'a. Most of the "Memorials" (dukhrani), or saints' days, which have special lections, occur on the Fridays between Christmas and Lent, and are therefore movable feasts; but some, such as Christmas, Theophany, the Dormition, and about thirty smaller days without proper readings, are on fixed days.

There are four shorter fasting periods besides the Great Lent; these are:

- the Fast of Mar Zaya (three days after the second Sunday of the Nativity)
- the Fast of the Virgins (after the first Sunday of the Epiphany)
- the Fast of the Ninevites (seventy days before Easter)
- the Fast of Mart Mariam (Our Lady) (from the first to the fourteenth of August)

The Fast of the Ninevites commemorates the repentance of Nineveh at the preaching of Jonah, and is carefully kept. Those of Mar Zaya and the Virgins are nearly obsolete. The Malabar Rite has largely adopted the Roman Calendar, and several Roman days have been added to that of the Chaldean Catholics. The Chaldean Easter coincides with that of the Eastern Orthodox Church, as the Julian Calendar is used to calculate Easter. The years are numbered, not from the birth of Christ, but from the Seleucid era (year 1 = 311 B.C.).

=== West Syriac Rite ===
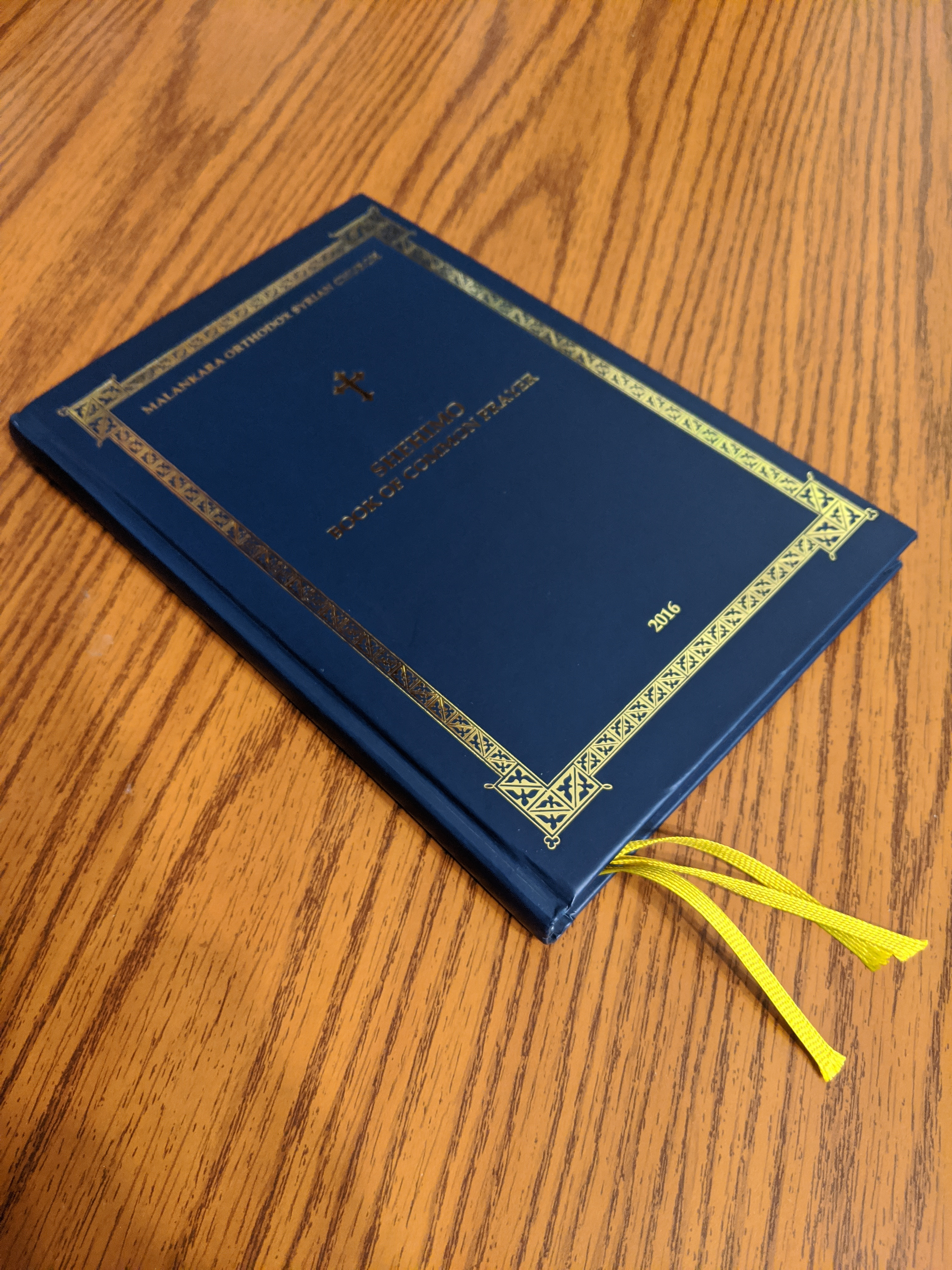
The Shehimo is a breviary used in Indian Orthodoxy and Syriac Orthodoxy to pray the canonical hours at fixed prayer times during the day while facing in the eastward direction.

The West Syriac Rite, used in India and Syria by the Indian Orthodox and Syriac Orthodox (Jacobites), as well as Syriac and Maronite Catholics, is in its origin simply the old rite of Antioch in the Syriac language. The translation must have been made very early, evidently before the division in the church over Chalcedon, before the influence of Constantinople over the Antiochian Rite had begun. No doubt as soon as Christian communities arose in the rural areas of Syria the prayers which in the cities (Antioch, Jerusalem, etc.) were said in Greek, were, as a matter of course, translated into Syriac for common use.

In accordance with Psalm 119:164, "Seven times in the day have I praised Thee for Thy judgments, O Righteous One," the Syriac Orthodox Church observes seven services of prayer each day:

- Evening or Ramsho prayer (Vespers)
- Drawing of the Veil or Sootoro, meaning "Protection", from Psalm 91, which is sung at this prayer, "He who sits under the protection of the Most High" (Compline)
- Midnight or Lilyo prayer (Matins)
- Morning or Saphro prayer (Prime, 6 a.m.)
- Third Hour or Tloth sho'in prayer (Terce, 9 a.m.)
- Sixth Hour or Sheth sho'in prayer (Sext, noon)
- Ninth Hour or Tsha' sho'in prayer (None, 3 p.m.)

The Midnight prayer (Matins) consists of three qawme or "watches" (literally "standings"). As in other traditional rites, the ecclesiastical day begins in the evening at sunset with Vespers (Ramsho). Today, even in monasteries, the services are grouped together: Vespers and Compline are said together; Matins and Prime are said together; and the Third, Sixth and Ninth Hours are said together; resulting in three times of prayer each day.

The Syriac Orthodox Book of Hours is called the Shehimo, "simple prayer". The Shehimo has offices for the canonical hours for each day of the week. Each canonical office begins and ends with a qawmo, a set of prayers that includes the Lord's Prayer. At the end of the office, the Nicene Creed is recited. The great part of the office consists of lengthy liturgical poems composed for the purpose, similar to the Byzantine odes.

In the Maronite eparchies of the United States, the breviary commonly used is called the ‘’Prayer of the Faithful’’. This is a three-volume set that is divided up by the liturgical year: Vol. I for the Sundays of the Church, Seasons of Announcement and Birth of Our Lord, Epiphany, and Three Weeks of Commemoration; Vol. II for Great Lent and Eastertide; Vol. III for Pentecost through Season of the Holy Cross. This edition is rather simplified, containing only the offices of Ramsho, Sootoro, and Safro.

== Armenian Rite ==
The Daily Services in the Armenian Apostolic Church and the Armenian Catholic Church are made up of nine services. The daily cycle of prayer begins with the Night Service, according to the ancient belief that a new day begins at nightfall.

The Night Service (midnight) Dedicated to the praising of God the Father. Themes of the service are: thanksgiving to God for the blessing of sleep and asking that the remainder of the night pass in peace and tranquility, and that the next day be spent in purity and righteousness.

The Morning Service (dawn) Dedicated to the praising of God the Son. Symbolizes the Resurrection of Christ and his appearance to the Myrrh-bearing Women.

The Sunrise Service (6:00 a.m.) (Note: Originally, the Sunrise Service was joined to the Morning Service.) Dedicated to the praising of the Holy Spirit. Symbolizes the appearance to Christ to the disciples after the Resurrection.

The Third Hour (9:00 a.m.) Dedicated to the Holy Spirit. Symbolizes Eve's original tasting the forbidden fruit and eventual liberation from condemnation through Jesus Christ. The service has a profound penitential meaning.

The Sixth Hour (noon) Dedicated to God the Father. Symbolizes Christ's Crucifixion. The prayers at the service ask for God's help towards feeble human nature.

The Ninth Hour (3:00 p.m.) Dedicated to God the Son. Symbolizes Christ's death and liberation of humanity from the power of the Hell.

The Evening Service (before sunset) Dedicated to God the Son. Symbolizes Christ's burial, asks God for a quiet night and a peaceful sleep.

The Peace Service (after sunset) Dedicated to the Holy Spirit. Symbolizes Christ's descent into Hell and liberation of the righteous from torments.

The Rest Service (before retiring for sleep) Dedicated to God the Father. In early times it was the continuation of the Peace Service.

In ancient times all nine services were offered every day, especially in monasteries. At present the following services are conducted in churches daily for the majority of the year:

- In the morning: Night and Morning Services together
- In the evening: Evening Service

During Great Lent, all of the services are offered on weekdays (except Saturday and Sunday) according to the following schedule:

- In the morning: Night, Morning and Sunrise Services
- In the afternoon: Third, Sixth, Ninth Hours
- In the evening:
  - Monday, Tuesday, Thursday: Peace Service
  - Wednesday, Friday: Rest Service
  - Saturday, Sunday: Evening Service

The book which contains the hymns which constitute the substance of the musical system of Armenian liturgical chant is the Sharagnots (see Armenian Octoechos), a collection of hymns known as Sharakan. Originally, these hymns were Psalms and biblical Canticles that were chanted during the services, similar to the Byzantine Canon. In addition, the eight modes are applied to the psalms of the Night office, called ganonaklookh (Canon head).

== Protestantism ==
=== Lutheran Rite ===
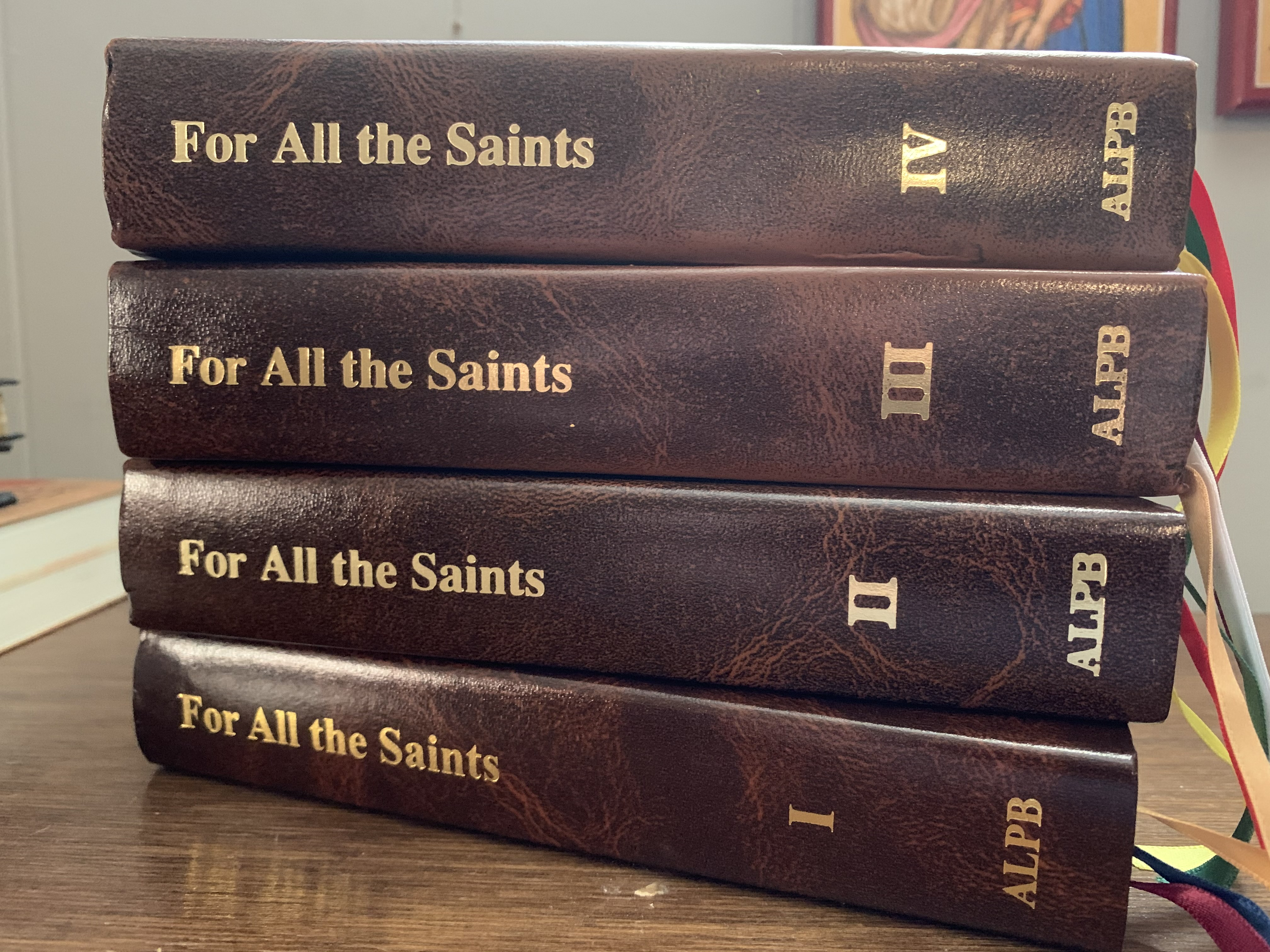
For All The Saints breviary, used in the Lutheran Churches, in four volumes

Like the Mass (liturgy) itself, the Daily Office within the Lutheran Church has had considerable variety, in both language and form. In the Reformation era, the Daily Office was largely consolidated into Matins, Vespers, and sometimes Compline, though there are notable exceptions. The Missale Germanicum of 1568, for example, simply translated the pre-Reformation breviary into German, retaining all of the canonical hours. The 1613 Cantica Sacra of the Magdeburg Cathedral, on the other hand, provides for Matins, Lauds, Prime, Terce, Sext, None, Vespers, and Compline to be sung in Latin every day of the year, including plainsong melodies and text for Latin invitatories, responsories, and antiphons provided. As a result, a rural Lutheran parish church in the sixteenth and seventeenth centuries might pray Saturday Vespers, Sunday Matins, and Sunday Vespers in the vernacular, while the nearby cathedral and city churches could be found praying the eight canonical hours in Latin with polyphony and Gregorian chant on a daily basis throughout the year.

The movement of Pietism emphasized a personal holiness over formal liturgy in Lutheran Germany, including the Daily Office, as described in Paul Graff's Geschichte der Auflösung der alten gottesdienstlichen Formen in der evangelischen Kirche Deutschlands. Nevertheless, a Latin choir hymnal was published in Nuremberg in 1724, and weekday observations of Matins and Vespers continued in many German Lutheran parishes. In Lutheran Scandinavia, the Daily Office has been celebrated from the time where the region became Evangelical Lutheran, with Evangelical Lutheran hymns being used in the recitation of the Daily Office.

A renewal in the Daily Office took place in the nineteenth century as a part of the confessional revival among Lutherans, particularly as a result of the work of such figures as Johann Konrad Wilhelm Löhe. Among English-speaking Lutherans in North America, this influence helped give rise to traditional forms of Matins and Vespers, based on sixteenth century Lutheran precedents, found in the Common Service of 1888, which were then included in English-language Lutheran hymnals in America prior to the 1970s. In 1969, the Worship Supplement of the Lutheran Church–Missouri Synod reintroduced the offices of Prime, Sext, and Compline, though only Compline was retained in subsequent hymnals.

In 1978, the Lutheran Book of Worship was published, containing newly revised forms of the Daily Office influenced by liturgical reforms in vogue following the Second Vatican Council, with an order of Evening Prayer that includes a "Service of Light". Both the 2006 Lutheran Service Book of the Lutheran Church–Missouri Synod and the 2006 Evangelical Lutheran Worship of the Evangelical Lutheran Church in America provide forms of the modern Daily Office rites introduced in Lutheran Book of Worship, though Lutheran Service Book also provides traditional forms of Matins and Vespers patterned on those found in the Common Service of 1888.

Today, in addition to denominational hymnals, there are a variety of books and resources used by Lutherans around the world to pray the hours. In Germany, the Diakonie Neuendettelsau religious institute uses a breviary unique to the order, and the Evangelisch-Lutherische Gebetsbruderschaft uses its Breviarium Lipsiensae: Tagzeitengebete. Among English-speaking Lutherans in the United States, the twentieth century saw a proliferation in breviaries and prayer books alongside renewed interest in praying the canonical hours. Among the volumes presently in use is a translation of the Breviarum Lipsiensae: Tagzeitengebete, entitled The Brotherhood Prayer Book, which provides for eight canonical hours and includes a psalter, responsories, and antiphons set to Gregorian chant. It is largely used by clergy and laity within the Lutheran Church–Missouri Synod. For All the Saints: A Prayer Book for and by the Church was published in 1995, and follows the daily lectionary of the 1978 Lutheran Book of Worship, providing three scriptural readings and a non-Scriptural reading from a Christian theologian or source for each day of the year in a two year cycle. In 2008, the Lutheran Church–Missouri Synod published The Treasury of Daily Prayer, the only current denominational effort among Lutherans to reinvigorate the observation of the Daily Office. For each day, it provides a psalm (or a portion thereof), an Old Testament reading, a New Testament reading, a writing from a Christian theologian or writer, a hymn stanza, and a collect. In a further effort to encourage widespread use of the Daily Office, the Treasury of Daily Prayer has also been made available as a mobile app called "PrayNow".

=== Anglican usage ===
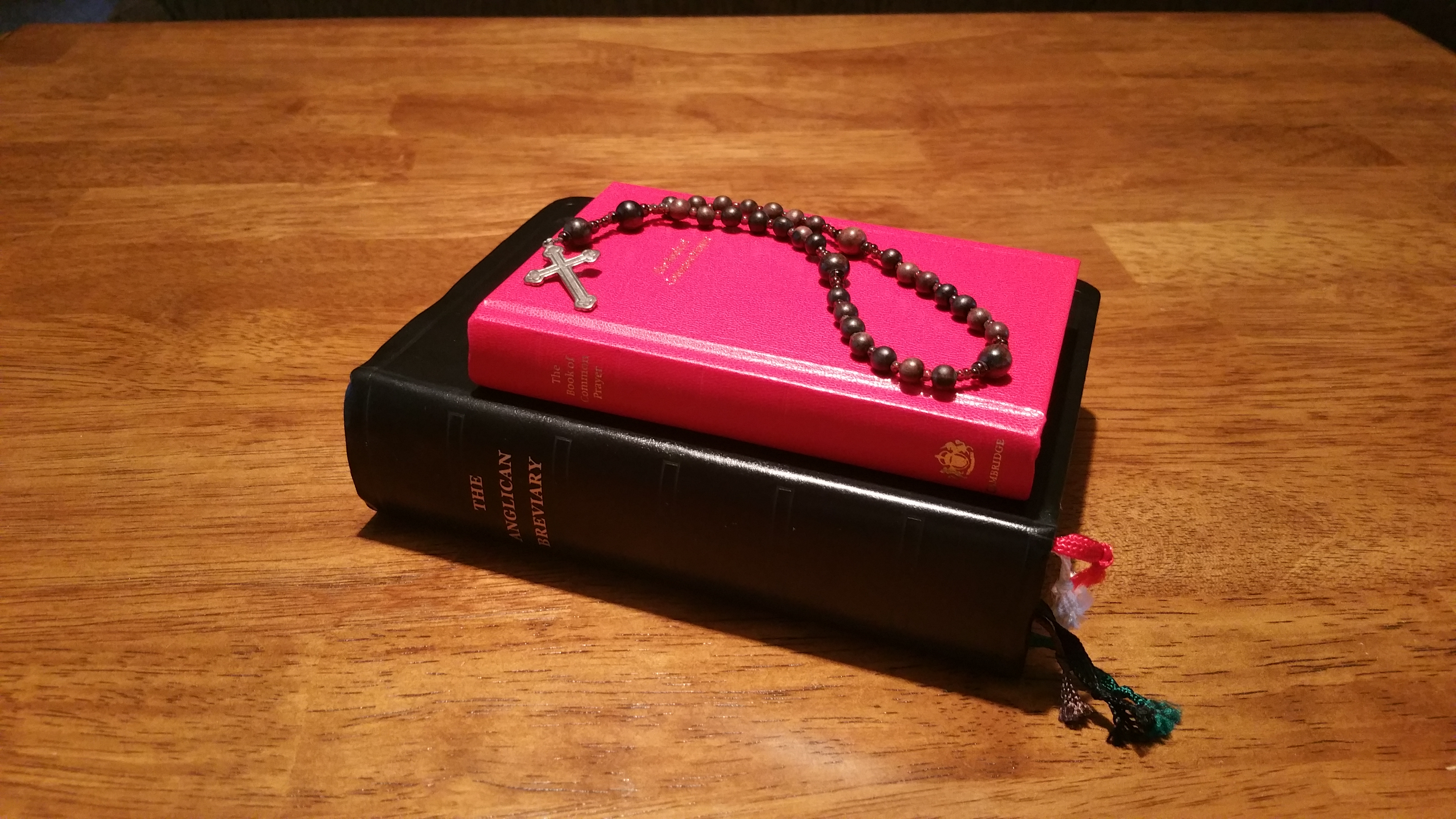
The Anglican Rosary sitting atop The Anglican Breviary and the Book of Common Prayer

The daily offices have always had an important place in Anglican spirituality. Until comparatively recently Mattins and Evensong were the principal Sunday services in most Anglican churches, sung to settings by composers both ancient and modern. While Evensong with its musical repertory spanning five centuries continues to play an important role in Anglican worship, the eucharist has replaced Morning Prayer as the principal service on Sunday mornings in most Anglican parishes and cathedrals.

The Book of Common Prayer, first published in 1549 and revised down the centuries, constitutes the basis of the liturgy for Anglicans and Anglican Use Roman Catholics. All Anglican prayer books provide offices for Morning Prayer (often called Mattins or Matins) and Evening Prayer (colloquially known as Evensong).

The traditional structure of Matins and Evensong in most Anglican prayer books reflects the intention by the reforming Archbishop of Canterbury, Thomas Cranmer, to return to the office's older roots as the daily prayer of parish churches. For this purpose, he followed some German Lutheran liturgies in eliminating the lesser hours and conflating the medieval offices of Matins and Lauds, while incorporating the canticles associated with each: the Benedictus and Te Deum. Similarly, Evening Prayer, also derived from German Lutheran liturgies, incorporated both the Magnificat from Vespers and the Nunc Dimittis from Compline. In Cranmer's adaptation of preceding Lutheran forms, each canticle was preceded by a reading from scripture. For the sake of simplicity, Cranmer also eliminated responsories and antiphons, although these have been restored in many contemporary Anglican prayer books. Since his time, every edition of the Book of Common Prayer has included the complete psalter, usually arranged to be read over the course of a month. One distinctive contribution of Anglican worship is a broad repertory of Anglican Chant settings for the psalms and canticles.

Since the early 20th century, revised editions of the Book of Common Prayer or supplemental service books published by Anglican churches have often added offices for midday prayer and Compline. In England and other Anglican provinces, service books now include four offices:

- Morning Prayer, corresponding to Matins and Lauds.
- Prayer During the Day, conflating the lesser hours of Terce, Sext, and None.
- Evening Prayer, corresponding to Vespers.
- Night Prayer, or Compline.

Some prayer books also include a selection of prayers and devotions specifically for family use. The 1979 Book of Common Prayer of the Episcopal Church in the U.S. also provides an "Order of Worship for the Evening" as a prelude to Evensong with blessings for the lighting of candles and the singing of the ancient Greek lamp-lighting hymn, the Phos Hilaron. In the Church of England, the publication in 2005 of Daily Prayer, the third volume of Common Worship, adds "Prayer During the Day" to the services for Morning Prayer, Evening Prayer, and Compline, and adds a selection of antiphons and responsories for the seasons of the Church Year. The 1989 New Zealand Prayer Book provides different outlines for Mattins and Evensong on each day of the week, as well as "Midday Prayer", "Night Prayer", and "Family Prayer". In 1995, the Episcopal Church (United States) published the Contemporary Office Book in one volume with the complete psalter and all readings from the two-year Daily Office lectionary.

Most Anglican monastic communities use a Daily Office based on the Book of Common Prayer or on Common Worship but with additional antiphons and devotions. The Order of the Holy Cross and Order of St. Helena published A Monastic Breviary (Wilton, Conn.: Morehouse-Barlow) in 1976. The Order of St. Helena published the St. Helena Breviary (New York: Church Publishing) in 2006 with a revised psalter eliminating male pronouns in reference to God. The All Saints Sisters of the Poor also use an elaborated version of the Anglican Daily Office. The Society of St. Francis publishes Celebrating Common Prayer, which has become especially popular for use among Anglicans.

Some Anglo-Catholics use the Anglican Breviary, an adaptation of the Pre-Vatican II Roman Rite and the Sarum Rite in the style of Cranmer's original Book of Common Prayer, along with supplemental material from other western sources, including a common of Octaves, a common of Holy Women, and other material. It provides for the eight historical offices in one volume, but does not include the Little Office of the Blessed Virgin Mary, which was bound along with many editions of the Breviarium Romanum. Other Anglo-Catholics use the Roman Catholic Liturgy of the Hours (US) or Divine Office (UK). Various Anglican adaptations of pre-Vatican II Roman office-books have appeared over the years, among the best known being Canon W. Douglas' translation of the 'Monastic Diurnal' into the idiom of the 'Book of Common Prayer'.

Historically, Anglican clergy have vested in cassock, surplice, and tippet for Morning and Evening Prayer, while bishops wear the rochet and chimere. In some monastic communities and Anglo-Catholic parishes, the officiant wears a surplice or an alb with stole and cope when Evensong is celebrated solemnly.

The canons of the Church of England and some other Anglican provinces require clergy to read Morning and Evening Prayer daily, either in public worship or privately. According to Canon C.24, "Every priest having a cure of souls shall provide that, in the absence of reasonable hindrance, Morning and Evening Prayer daily and on appointed days the Litany shall be said in the church, or one of the churches, of which he is the minister." Canon C.26 stipulates that, "Every clerk (cleric) in Holy Orders is under obligation, not being let (prevented) by sickness or some other urgent cause, to say daily the Morning and Evening Prayer...." In other Anglican provinces, the Daily Office is not a canonical obligation but is strongly encouraged.

=== Methodist usage ===
F. W. Macdonald, the biographer of The Rt. Rev. John Fletcher Hurst, stated that Oxford Methodism "with its almost monastic rigors, its living by rule, its canonical hours of prayer, is a fair and noble phase of the many-sided life of the Church of England".

The traditional 1784 Methodist Daily Office is contained in The Sunday Service of the Methodists, which was written by John Wesley himself. It was consequently updated in the Book of Offices, published in 1936 in Great Britain, and The United Methodist Book of Worship, published in 1992 in the United States. Some Methodist religious orders publish the Daily Office to be used for that community, for example, The Book of Offices and Services of The Order of Saint Luke contains Morning, Mid-Morning, Noon, Mid-Afternoon, Evening, Compline and Vigil.

Certain Methodist parishes, such as Saint Paul's Free Methodist Church, offer a daily corporate praying of the canonical hours at church.

=== Reformed usage ===
Some Reformed churches—notably the Presbyterian Church (USA) and the United Church of Christ—have published daily office books adapted from the ancient structure of morning and evening prayer in the Western church, usually revised for the purpose of inclusive language.

The New Century Psalter, published in 1999 by The Pilgrim Press, includes an inclusive-language revision of the psalms adapted from the New Revised Standard Version of the Bible with refrains and complete orders for Morning and Evening Prayer. Simple family prayers for morning, evening and the close of day are also provided.

Book of Common Worship Daily Prayer, published in 1994 by Westminster John Knox Press, includes the daily offices from The Book of Common Worship of 1993, the liturgy of the Presbyterian Church USA. In addition to Morning and Evening Prayer there is a complete service for Compline. Its psalter—an inclusive-language revision of the psalter from the 1979 American Book of Common Prayer—also includes a collect for each psalm. Antiphons and litanies are provided for the seasons of the church year. A new Book of Common Worship Daily Prayer with expanded content was published in 2018. It adds a service for Mid-Day Prayer. Its new psalter is from Evangelical Lutheran Worship.

Both books are intended for ecumenical use and can be used with any daily lectionary.

=== Anabaptism ===
In Anabaptist Christianity, Mennonites (especially Old Order Mennonites and Conservative Mennonites) and Amish have family prayer every morning and evening, which is done kneeling; the Christenpflicht prayer book is used for this purpose. Bible readings may be read after this, often after the evening prayer; to this end, the Tägliches Manna devotional is used by many Anabaptists.

== See also ==
- Fixed prayer times
- Watches of the Night
