= Horologion =

Liturgical book of the Eastern churches

The horologion or horologium (pl. horologia), also known by other names, is the book of hours for the Eastern Orthodox and Eastern Catholic Churches. It provides the acolouthia (ἀκολουθίαι, akolouthíai), the fixed portions of the Divine Service used every day at certain canonical hours. Additional parts of the service are changed daily, mostly according to the Menologium.

== Names ==
Horologium is the latinized version of the Greek hōrológion (ὡρολόγιον), from hṓra (ὥρα, "time period, hour"), lógos (λόγος, "writing, recording") + -ion (-ιον), together originally meaning a sundial, clepsydra, or other timekeeping device. (The same roots are used in horology, the scientific study of time.) In Byzantine Greek, the word was repurposed to also denote the Eastern books of hours, records of the hymns and prayers to be offered at the proper times of each day. The plural form of both the Latin and Greek forms of the word is horologia.

In English, the horologion is also sometimes known as the Book of Hours or the Orthodox book of hours, from the nearest Roman Catholic equivalent. The book is known as the Chasoslov (Часocлoвъ) in Church Slavonic and as the Orologhion or Ceaslov in Romanian.

== Description ==
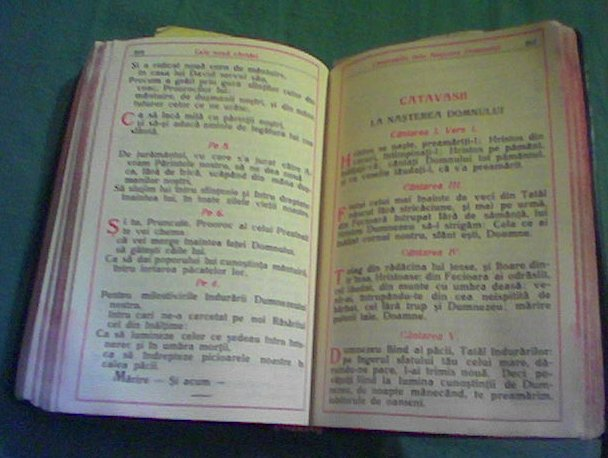
Horologion in Romanian

The horologion is primarily a book for the use of the reader and chanters. The Euchologion is used by the priest and deacon instead. Several varieties of horologia exist, the most complete of which is the Great Horologion or Horologium (Ancient Greek: Ὡρολόγιον τò μέγα, Hōrológion tò méga; Church Slavonic: Великий Часословъ, Velikij Chasoslov; Romanian: Ceaslovul Mare, Orologhionul Mare). It contains the fixed portions of the Daily Office (Vespers, Greater and Lesser Compline, the Midnight Office, Matins, the Little Hours, the Inter-Hours, Typica, and the prayers before meals). The parts for the reader and chanters are given in full, while the priest and deacon's parts are abbreviated. Great Horologia also contain a list of the saints commemorated throughout the year with their troparia and kontakia; selected propers for Sundays; moveable feasts from the Menaion, Triodion, and Pentecostarion; and the various canons and other devotional services. The Great Horologion is most commonly used in Greek-speaking churches.

Other editions of the horologion are usually shorter. They still give the fixed portions of the Daily Office in full, but other texts are much more abbreviated since they are found in full in other liturgical books. In addition, such texts also often contain morning and evening prayers, the Order of Preparation for Holy Communion, and prayers to be said after receiving Holy Communion.

== See also ==
- Agpeya
- Canonical hours
- Menologion
