= Typica =

Byzantine Rite Christian ritual

The Typica (Church Slavonic: Изобрази́тельны, Izobrazítelny) is a part of the Divine Office of Eastern Orthodox worship and Eastern Catholic liturgy in the Byzantine Rite that is appointed to be read on any day the Liturgy is celebrated with vespers, or the Typicon does not permit the celebration of the Liturgy (as occurs, for example, on weekdays during Great Lent), (Note: During the lesser Fasts also, on weekdays on which there is only a simple commemoration in the Menaion) or may be celebrated but is not either because no priest is present. When the Liturgy may be celebrated but is not, then the Typica is read at the time the Liturgy is appointed to be celebrated, and it contains the scriptural readings and other propers for the Liturgy.

The Typica, like the hours that it is aggregated with, is rarely read in Greek parish churches, but it is relatively common in Slavic churches.

The name "Typica" refers to the "Typical Psalms" (Psalm 102, Psalm 145, and the Beatitudes), which together with parts of the Liturgy of the Catechumens comprise the non-lenten form of the Typica.

== Description ==
The service of Typica consists in Psalms 102 and 145, the Beatitudes, of short series of verses and hymns ("The heavenly choir..."), the Symbol of Faith, a short prayer of repentance, the Lord's Prayer, a series of appointed Kontakia, a prayer to the Trinity and Psalm 33, along with a dismissal that closely resembles that of other services.

When read in place of the Liturgy's celebration, the Typica is read after the Sixth Hour (Note: In the usage of the Old Believers, the Typica is read after the Ninth hour, that is said jointly to the Third and Sixth hours.) in the place where the Liturgy would be celebrated; otherwise it is read after the Ninth Hour.

When replacing the Liturgy, the propers of the Liturgy are used, e.g., the troparia inserted between the verses of the Beatitudes, the kontakia after the Lord's Prayer, and the scriptural readings with their corresponding prokimena.

On the weekdays of Great Lent the Psalms are omitted and between the verses of the Beatitudes is inserted "Remember us, O Lord, when Thou comest into Thy kingdom" with small prostrations. Then the choir sings "Remember us, O Lord...; Remember us, O Master...; Remember us, O Holy..." with a great prostration. There are no readings, and, as is typical of Lenten services, the Prayer of St. Ephraim is used.

The Typica is also appointed to be read after the Royal Hours on the Eve of Nativity, the Eve of Theophany, and on Great Friday.

== Text ==
The text of the Typica can be found in English in several places including "The Unabbreviated Horologion". The text is available online in Church Slavonic and, for the Lenten form only, in Greek.
