= Aliturgical days =

Sometimes, both Good Friday and Holy Saturday are called aliturgical days because the mass is not celebrated. Strictly speaking, this definition is inaccurate, since at least the Liturgy of the Hours is celebrated on these days, which is also part of the liturgy of the Church.

== Byzantine rite ==
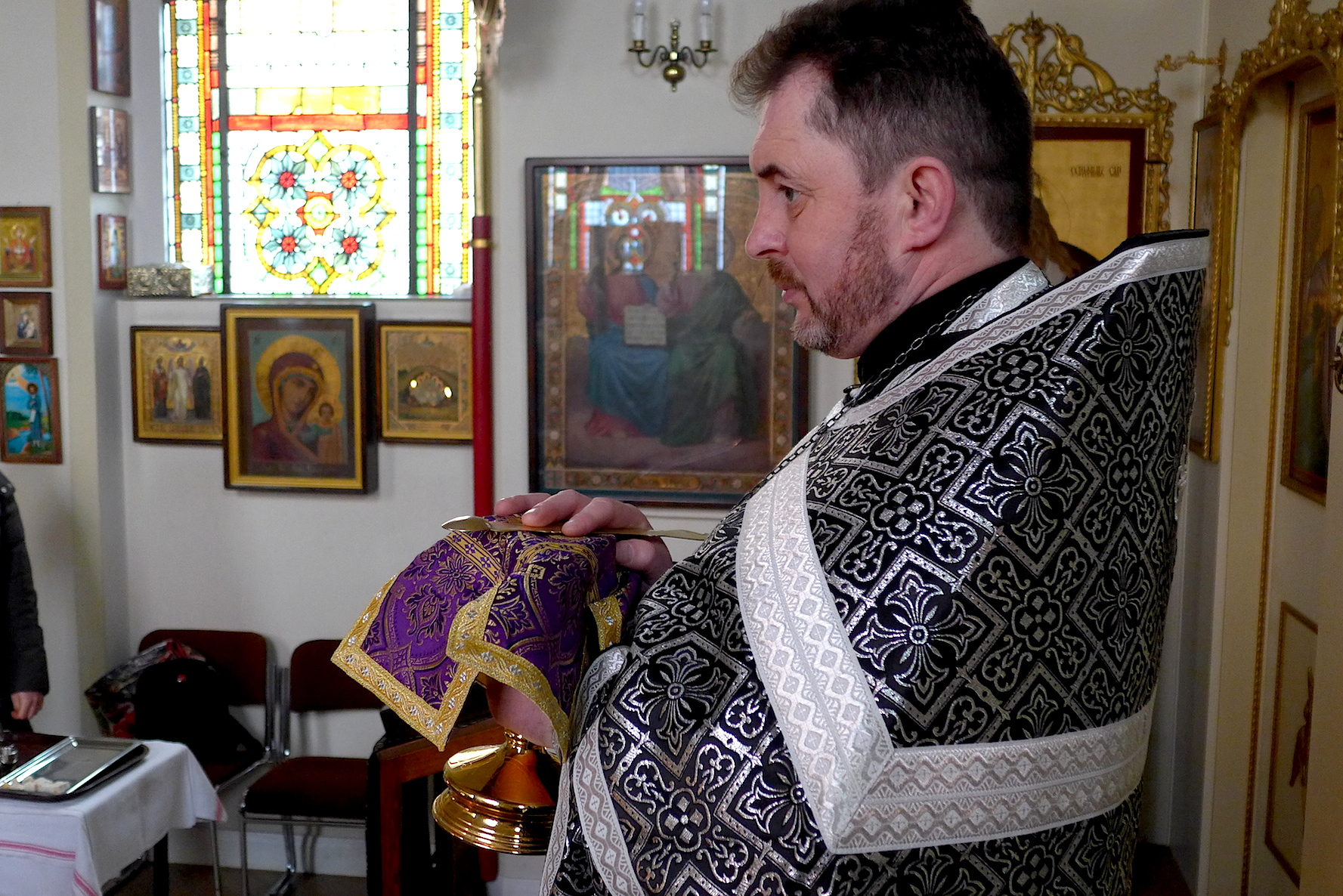
A Russian Orthodox priest during a Presanctified Liturgy

In the Byzantine rite used by the Eastern Orthodox Church and Byzantine Catholic Churches there multiple aliturgical days beyond Good Friday. During Great Lent, it is forbidden to consecrate the Eucharist, so the Liturgy of the Presanctified Gifts is used, where a previously consecrated host is used.
