= Inter-Hours =

The Inter-Hours (Ancient Greek: Μεσώρια; Greek: Μεσώριον; Church Slavonic: Междоча́сие or поча́сие, romanized: Mezhdochásie or pochásie) are brief services in the Daily Office of the Eastern Orthodox and Greek Catholic Churches. The Inter-Hours are called for during the Lenten seasons of the Church year. They are styled after the Little Hours—First Hour, Third Hour, Sixth Hour, and Ninth Hour—only briefer.

The Inter-Hours are called for during the Lesser Fasts (Nativity Fast, and the Apostles' Fast. According to Nikolsky Ustav, they are to be read during Great Lent if the Ladder of Divine Ascent is not read during the Little Hours.

Each Inter-Hour follows one of the Little Hours is named for the Hour it follows (i.e., the Inter-Hour of the First Hour, etc.). The structure of each Inter-Hour is as follows:

- O come, let us worship...
- Three Psalms (these are fixed for the particular Inter-Hour, and do not vary from day to day)
- Trisagion and the Lord's Prayer
- Troparia
- Lord, have mercy (40 times)
- Concluding prayers and blessing
- Prayer of St. Ephraim
- Final prayer
- Dismissal by the Priest

The Fixed Psalms are as follows:

- Inter-Hour of the First Hour—45, 91, 92 (LXX)
- Inter-Hour of the Third Hour—29, 31, 60
- Inter-Hour of the Sixth Hour—55, 56, 69
- Inter-Hour of the Ninth Hour—112, 137, 139

The Inter-Hours are only done on "days with Alleluia"; that is to say, days when the services follow a Lenten format and, as a result, the Divine Liturgy may not be celebrated. According to present-day usage, the Inter-Hours are often said only on the first day of the Lesser Fasts.
