= Virgin of Smolensk =

Medieval Byzantine icon depicting the Virgin and Child

- Our Lady of Smolensk, Смоленская икона Божией Матери (Russian)
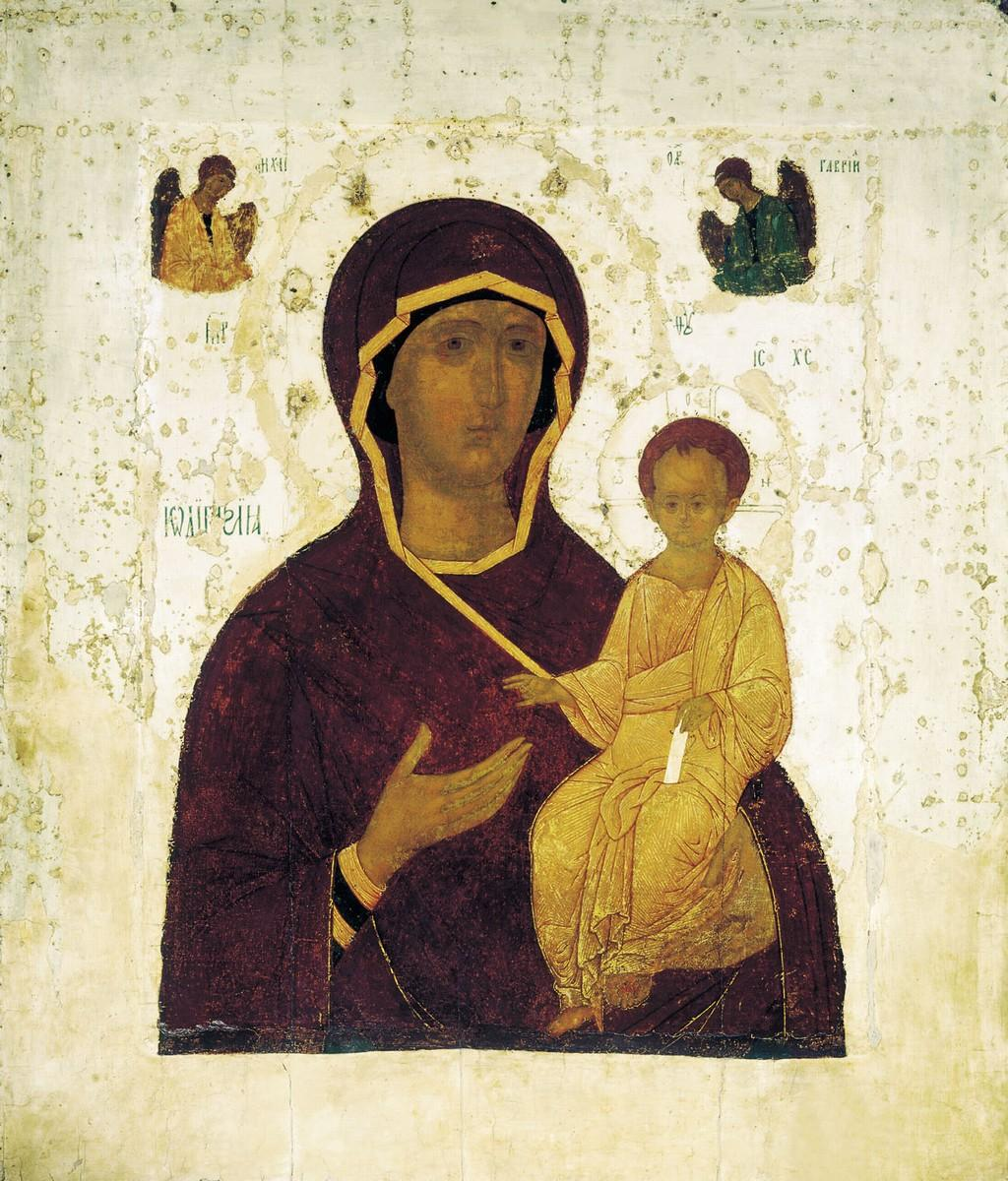
- Version of the Smolensk Icon of the Mother of God (Dionisius, 1482, Russian Museum, St. Petersburg)
- Artist: Unknown, Luke the Evangelist according to Sacred Tradition
- Year: 33(?)-1131
- Medium: Tempera
- Subject: Virgin Mary

The Icon of Our Lady of Smolensk (Russian: Смоленская икона Божией Матери) is an icon of the Mother of God (Hodegetria) revered in Orthodoxy. The icon is celebrated on July 28 (August 10). According to tradition it is believed that the icon protects and defends the western borders of Russia.

== History ==
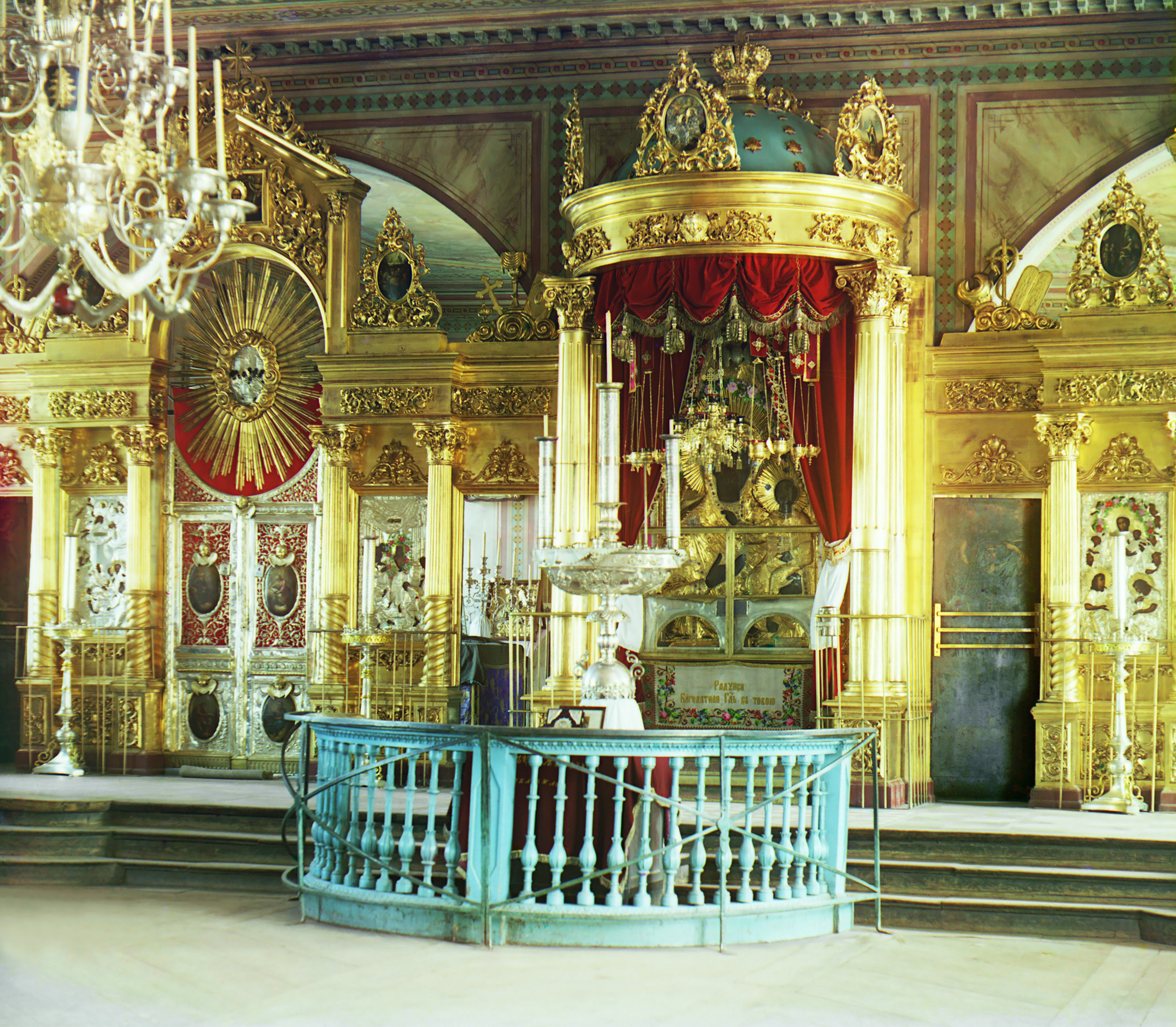
Smolensk icon in the church above the Dnieper Gates (photo by Sergey Prokudin-Gorsky, 1912)

There is no clear or reliable information about when and by whom the icon was brought to Russia from Greece. Evgeny Poselyanin pointed out that there was one legend which stated that the icon came to Russia in the middle of the 11th century (in 1046), when the Byzantine Emperor Constantine IX Monomachos blessed his daughter, Princess Anna, who became the wife of Prince Vsevolod Yaroslavich, with it for her journey. The icon became a family relic of the Russian princes, a symbol of the continuity and dynastic closeness of Constantinople and Kievan Rus'. The son of Vsevolod Yaroslavich, Prince Vladimir II Monomakh, in 1095 transferred the icon from Chernigov (his first appanage) to Smolensk, where in 1101 he founded the Dormition Cathedral in Smolensk, in which the icon was placed and became known as the Smolensk icon.

Church tradition attributes the icon's help in saving the city in 1239 from the invasion of Batu Khan's troops.

The icon was placed in the Cathedral of the Annunciation to the right of the Royal doors. In 1456, the embassy of Bishop Misael of Smolensk asked Grand Duke Vasily the Dark to return the icon to them. The prince, on the advice of Metropolitan Jonah, decided to fulfill the request of the Smolensk ambassadors and return the relic. The icon was solemnly carried out of the Kremlin with a religious procession on January 18, 1456 (according to other sources, July 28, 1456) and escorted to the Savvino-Storozhevsky Monastery on Devichye Pole, at the entrance to the Old Smolensk Road, where after a farewell service it was released to Smolensk.

According to Marat Sukhman, the icon was escorted "not to the Savvin Monastery, but to the Church of the Annunciation in Dorogomilovo"; Both versions are given by Ivan Snegiryov.

During the French invasion of Russia, Ireneus (Falkovsky) took the icon from Smolensk to Moscow on August 5–6, and on the day of the Battle of Borodino, it was carried around the White City and the Kremlin along with the revered miraculous icons of Iveron and Vladimir. Before the French entered the city, the icon was taken to Yaroslavl; in the 20s of December, it was returned to Smolensk. On the eve of the Battle of Borodino, a copy of the icon from the gate church of the Nativity of the Virgin Mary in the Smolensk Kremlin, written in 1602, was carried before the Russian troops; it was returned to Smolensk on November 10, 1812.

The 1456 copy of the icon was taken by the Hegumen of the monastery, Methodia, along with the sacristy to Vologda on August 31.

The original of the icon was kept in the Dormition Cathedral in Smolensk, but after the city was occupied by German troops in 1941, the icon was not found. In the post-war period, the place of the ancient icon in the Dormition Cathedral in Smolensk was taken by an icon from the early 17th century from the church above the Dnieper Gate of the Smolensk Kremlin.

One of the revered copies of the Smolensk icon is the Smolensk Bugabash Icon of the Mother of God, which is kept in the convent of the same name - the Bogoroditse-Odigitrievsky Convent in the village of Bugabashevo, Bakalinsky District, Republic of Bashkortostan.
