= Iconostasis =

Screen dividing Eastern Orthodox churches

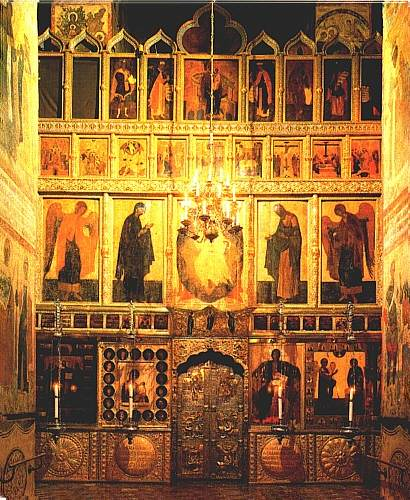
Five-panel Deesis row (center), iconostasis in the Cathedral of the Annunciation in the Moscow Kremlin by Theophanes the Greek, 1405

In Eastern Christianity, an iconostasis (Greek: εἰκονοστάσιον) is a wall of icons and religious paintings, separating the nave from the sanctuary in a church. Iconostasis also refers to a portable icon stand that can be placed anywhere within a church. The iconostasis evolved from the Byzantine templon, a process complete by the 15th century.

A direct comparison for the function of the main iconostasis can be made to the layout of the great Temple in Jerusalem. That Temple was designed with three parts. The holiest and inner-most portion was that where the Ark of the Covenant was kept. This portion, the Holy of Holies, was separated from the second larger part of the building's interior by a curtain, the "veil of the temple". Only the High Priest was allowed to enter the Holy of Holies. The third part was the entrance court.

This architectural tradition for the two main parts can be seen carried forward in Christian churches and is still most demonstratively present in Eastern Orthodox churches where the iconostasis divides the altar, the Holy of Holies where the Eucharist is performed – the manifestation of the New Covenant – from the larger portion of the church accessible to the faithful. In the Eastern Orthodox tradition, usually only men can enter the altar portion behind the iconostasis. However, one will see women serving behind the iconostasis at female monasteries.

The word iconostasis comes from the Greek εἰκονοστάσι(-ον) (eikonostási(-on)), still in common use in Greece and Cyprus), which means 'icon stand'.

== Location ==
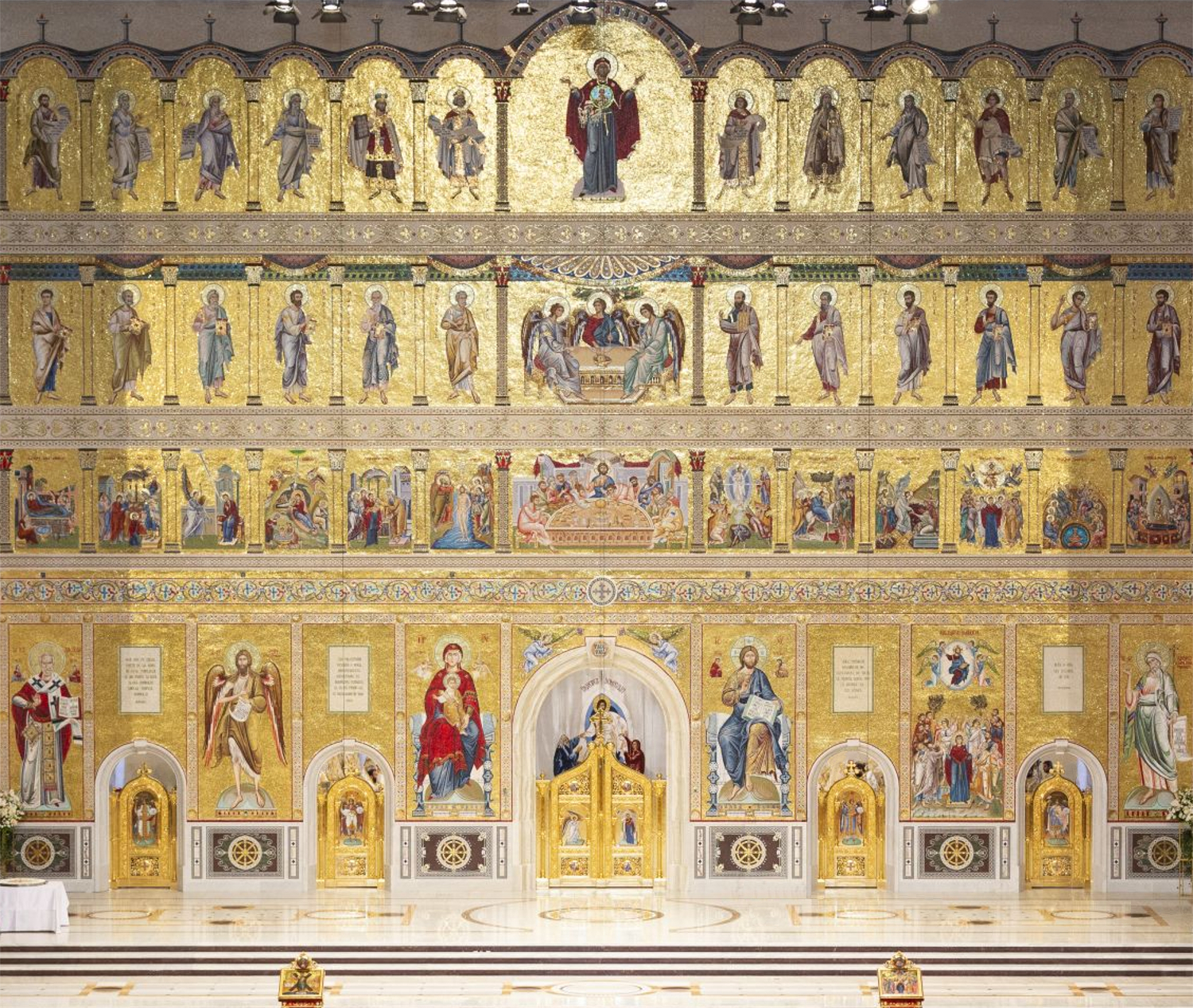
People's Salvation Cathedral in Bucharest (the world's largest Orthodox iconostasis)

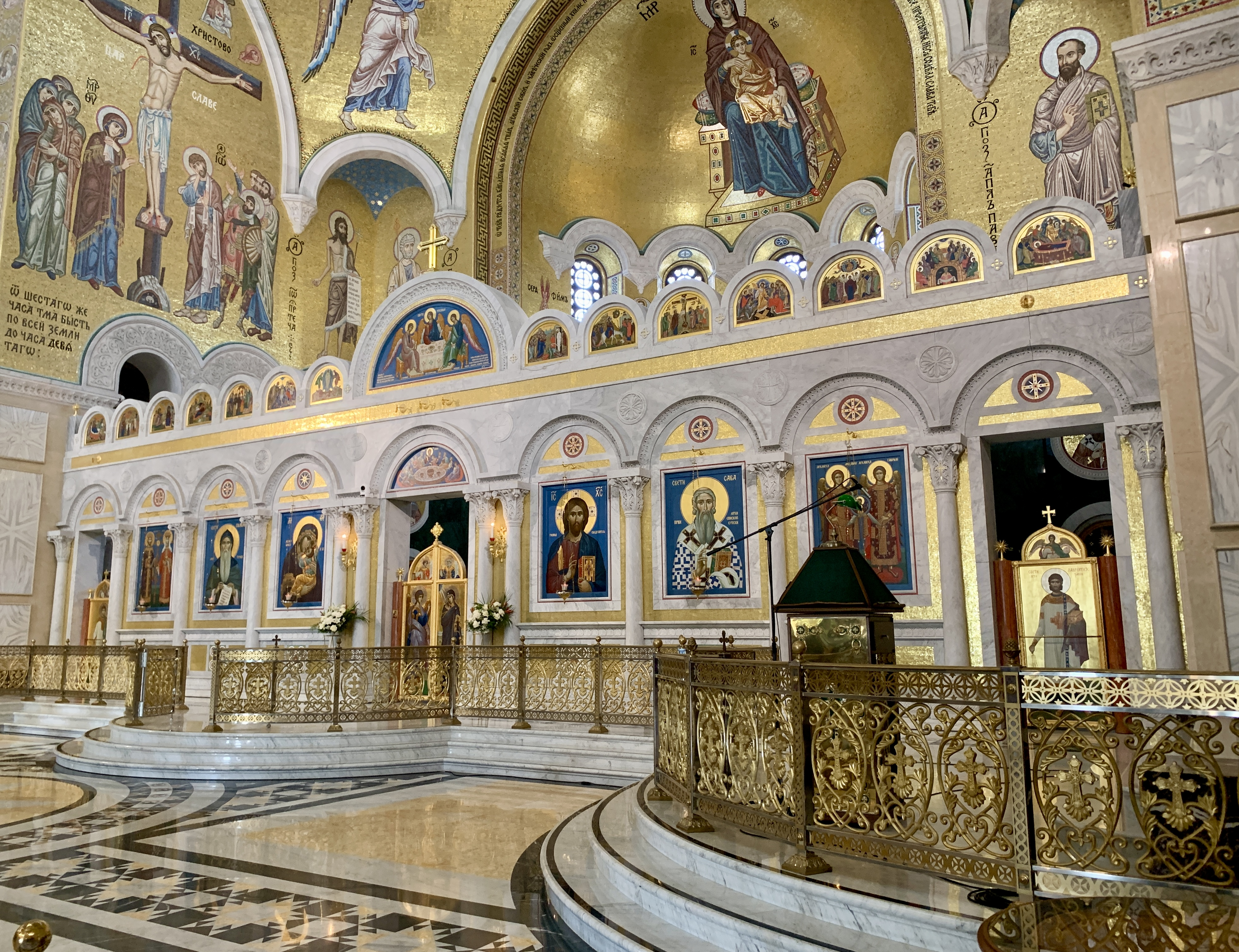
The Temple of Saint Sava in Belgrade

The nave is the main body of the church where most of the worshippers stand, and the sanctuary is the area around the altar, east of the nave. The sanctuary is usually one to three steps higher than the nave. The iconostasis does not sit directly on the edge of the sanctuary but is usually set a few feet back from the edge of the top step. This forms a walkway in front of the iconostasis for the clergy, called a soleas. In the very center of the soleas is an extension (or thrust), often rounded, called the ambon, on which the deacon will stand to give litanies during the services.

The iconostasis, though often tall, rarely touches the ceiling. Acoustically, this permits the ekphoneses of the clergy to be heard by the faithful. In small, modern churches the iconostasis may be absent; in such cases it is replaced by a few small icons on analogia, forming a virtual divide.

The iconostasis typically has three openings or sets of doors: the Beautiful Gates or Holy Doors in the center, and the North and South Doors to either side. The Beautiful Gates are sometimes called the Royal Doors, but that name more properly belongs to the central doors connecting the narthex, or porch, to the nave. (Note: So called because the Emperor used to enter by these doors during official ceremonies at Hagia Sophia in Constantinople.) They remain shut whenever a service is not being held. Modern custom as to when they should be opened during services varies depending upon jurisdiction and local custom.

The North and South Doors are often called Deacons' Doors because the deacons use them frequently. Icons of sainted deacons are often depicted on these doors (particularly St. Stephen the Protomartyr and St. Ephrem the Syrian). Alternatively, they may be called Angels' Doors, and the Archangels Michael and Gabriel are often depicted there. The South Door is typically the "entrance" door, and Michael is depicted there because he is the "Defender"; the North Door is the "exit", and Gabriel is depicted here because he is the "Messenger" of God. (In the Greek and Antiochian liturgical tradition, the Archangel Michael is usually stationed on the north (i.e. "exit") door, and Gabriel on the south (i.e. "entrance") door, and that it is far more common in modern times to see the Archangels than the Deacons on these doors). These doors may also be casually referred to as the "side doors".

There are some exceptions where both the side doors depict Archangel Michael. The most notable exception is of the church of Saint George (Aghios Georgios) inside the Ecumenical Patriarchate of Constantinople (in today's Istanbul).

In many monastery churches and chapels (though often not in the katholikon, the monastery's main church) one may find iconostases with only two doors: the Holy Doors and the North Door. These churches are used for simpler monastic observances when only a hieromonk would be serving alone.

== Placement of icons ==
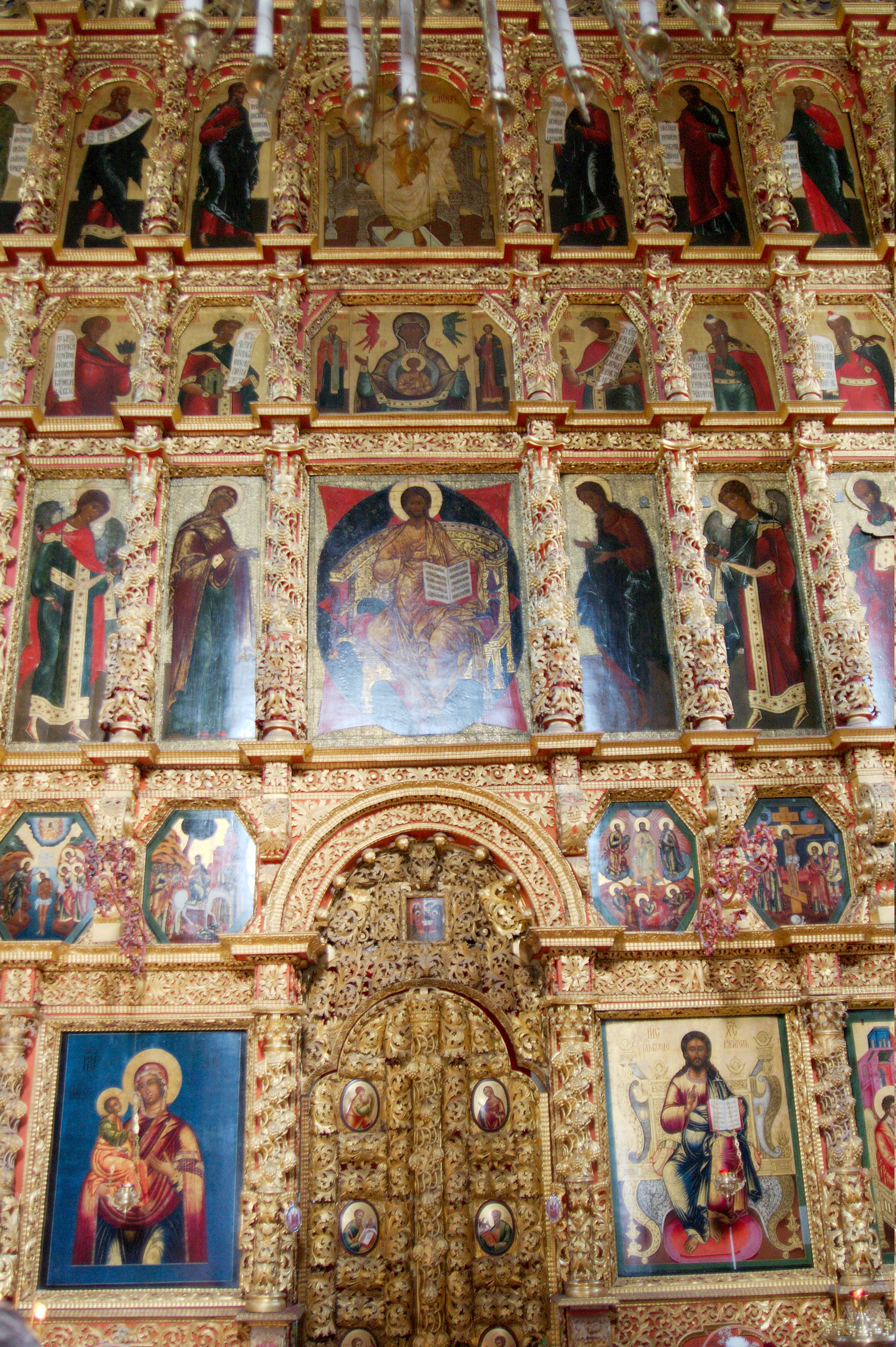
Mid-17th-century iconostasis at Ipatiev Monastery. To either side of the Holy Doors are Christ Pantokrator and the Theotokos; above them, the Great Feasts; above them, the Deesis; above that Prophets to either side of Our Lady of the Sign; above them the Apostles to either side of the Holy Trinity.

A number of guidelines or rubrics govern which icons are on which parts of the iconostasis, although there is some room for variation. In its fullest Slavic development, it comprised five tiers of icons:

1. The bottom tier is sometimes called Sovereign. On the right side of the Beautiful Gates (from the nave facing forward) is an icon of Christ (often Pantokrator), which symbolizes his Second Coming and on the left side is an icon of the Theotokos (Virgin Mary), symbolizing Christ's Incarnation, and entrance into this world. Therefore, all things take place between Christ's first and second coming. Other icons on this tier beside those on the doors themselves usually include depictions of the patron saint or feast day to which the church is dedicated, John the Baptist, Saint Nicholas, one or more of the Four Evangelists etc. Above this are two interchangeable tiers: the Deisis and the Twelve Great Feasts:
2. In the center of the Deisis is a large icon of Christ Enthroned. To the left and right are icons of John the Baptist and the Theotokos in attitudes of supplication. They are often flanked by icons of the Archangels Michael and Gabriel, then Sts. Peter and Paul, and then any other important Church Fathers that may be desired for inclusion as space allows.
3. The Feasts tier contains icons of the twelve Great Feasts of the liturgical year. Above this, the top two tiers are also interchangeable with each other:
4. The Old Testament Prophets and Patriarchs—the latter including the 12 sons of Jacob—often to either side of an icon of Our Lady of the Sign; and
5. the Twelve Apostles, often to either side of and icon depicting either Christ at the Second Coming or the Holy Trinity.

It is also not uncommon to find an icon of the Mystical Supper, which depicts the Last Supper, and by extension the Communion of Saints in the Kingdom of God, somewhere above the Beautiful Gates.

The Sovereign (bottom) tier is found in all iconostases, but other tiers are somewhat optional. In general, preference is given to the Deisis or the Feasts tiers if only some of them can be included, and only the largest and most elaborate iconostases have all five tiers.

Many modern iconostases in the Greek tradition only include the bottom ("Sovereign") tier, and on occasion a second tier of smaller icons, usually depicting either the Great Feasts or the Apostles (with an icon of the Mystical Supper, or occasionally the Hospitality of Abraham) above the Beautiful Gates.

When the Iconostasis does not reach all the way to the ceiling, it is often surmounted by a central cross, centered directly above the Beautiful Gates. If the cross bears an iconographic depiction of Christ Crucified, it is often flanked by icons of the Theotokos and St. John the Evangelist standing at the foot of the cross.

== Rubrics ==
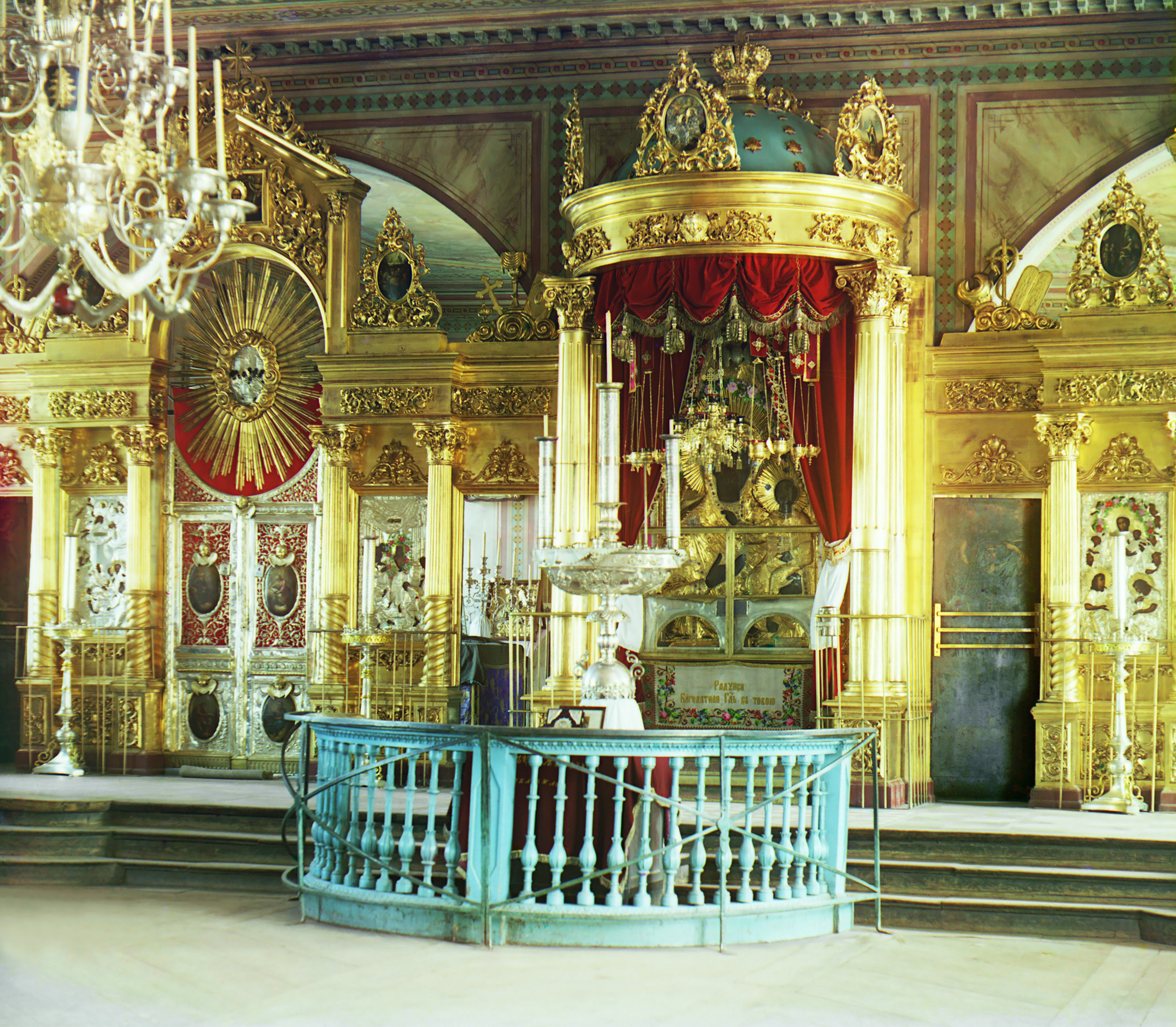
Chapel of the holy icon of Theotokos of Smolensk in the Assumption Cathedral in Smolensk

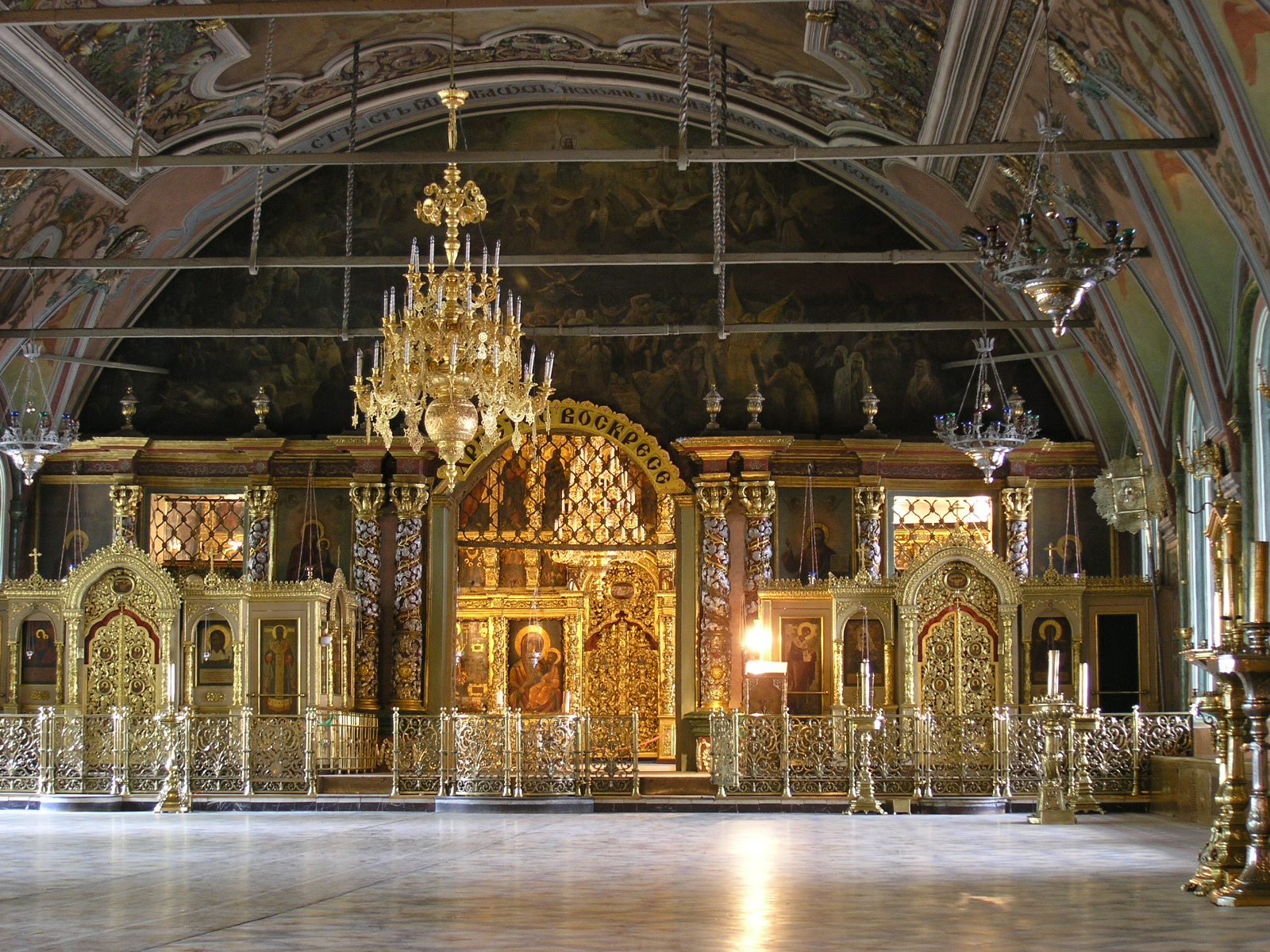
A Moscow Baroque icon screen in the Trinity Lavra in Sergeyev Posad

There are rules regarding who may enter or leave the sanctuary (altar), and by which door. Neither the Beautiful Gates (Holy/Royal Doors – central doors) nor the space between them and the altar table may be used by laity under any circumstances, although infants are either carried into the altar through them in the "churching" rite if they are boys, or if they are girls, the infant is simply presented at the doors. Bishops may enter through the Beautiful Gates at any time; priests and deacons may do so only at specific times during the services when the gates are open (but during Bright Week they always enter and exit through them). All others enter the sanctuary through the side doors.

In a convent, only the abbess and elder nuns are permitted to enter the sanctuary (altar), and they may only enter through the side doors. The abbess may enter at any time, but the other nuns need a blessing to enter.

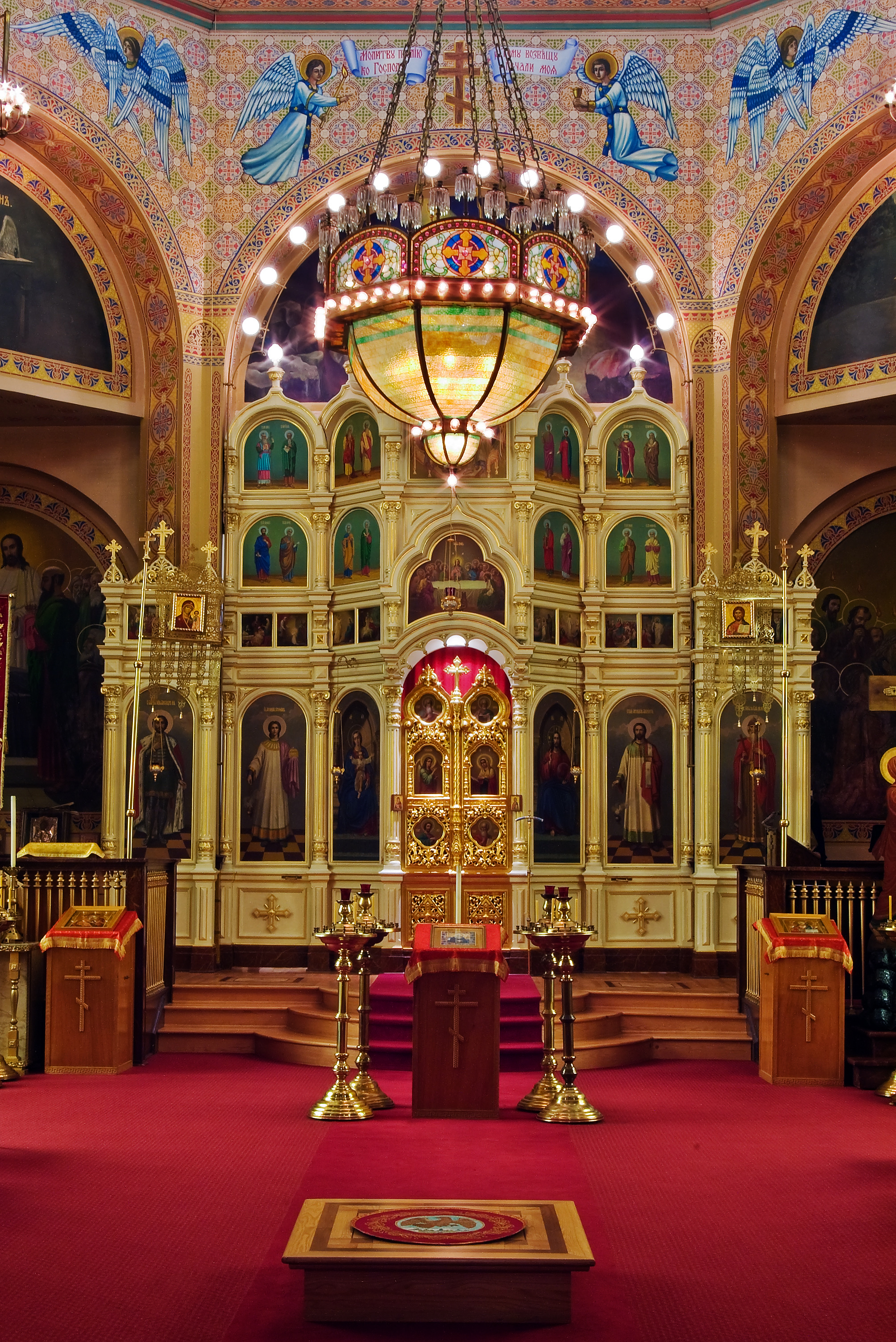
Iconostasis at Holy Trinity Cathedral in Chicago, Illinois

Male members of the laity who are usually allowed to enter the sanctuary include those involved in the running of the particular church, i.e., cantors and choristers, altar servers/acolytes, church keepers and vestrymen, etc.

In the Romanian tradition, on the day of the consecration of the altar in the church, the laity, including women, were permitted to enter and venerate the altar until the beginning of the Vespers of Consecration. These guidelines were developed over the course of many centuries, with both theologically symbolic and practical reasons for them.

== Theological implications ==
The iconostasis does not separate the nave from the Holy of Holies; rather, it is seen as bringing them together. The iconostasis is the link between heaven (the Holy of Holies) and the nave (the Holy Place). Therefore, everything is symbolic upon the iconostasis. The icons of Christ, the Theotokos, and various saints and feasts are there because Christ, the Theotokos, the saints etc., are said to lead and guide followers into the Holy of Holies. Therefore, the personages on the icons upon the iconostasis guide followers into heaven, and therefore the iconostasis is said to connect, not separate. Icons are seen as windows and bridges to heaven. Therefore, in a sense the iconostasis represents Christ, who is the connection, the door, between both realms. The perfect explanation for the iconostasis, and its uniting purpose, is seen in Hebrews 10:19–20, "Therefore, brethren, since we have confidence to enter the sanctuary by the blood of Jesus, by the new and living way which he opened for us through the curtain, that is through his flesh.".

== Evolution ==
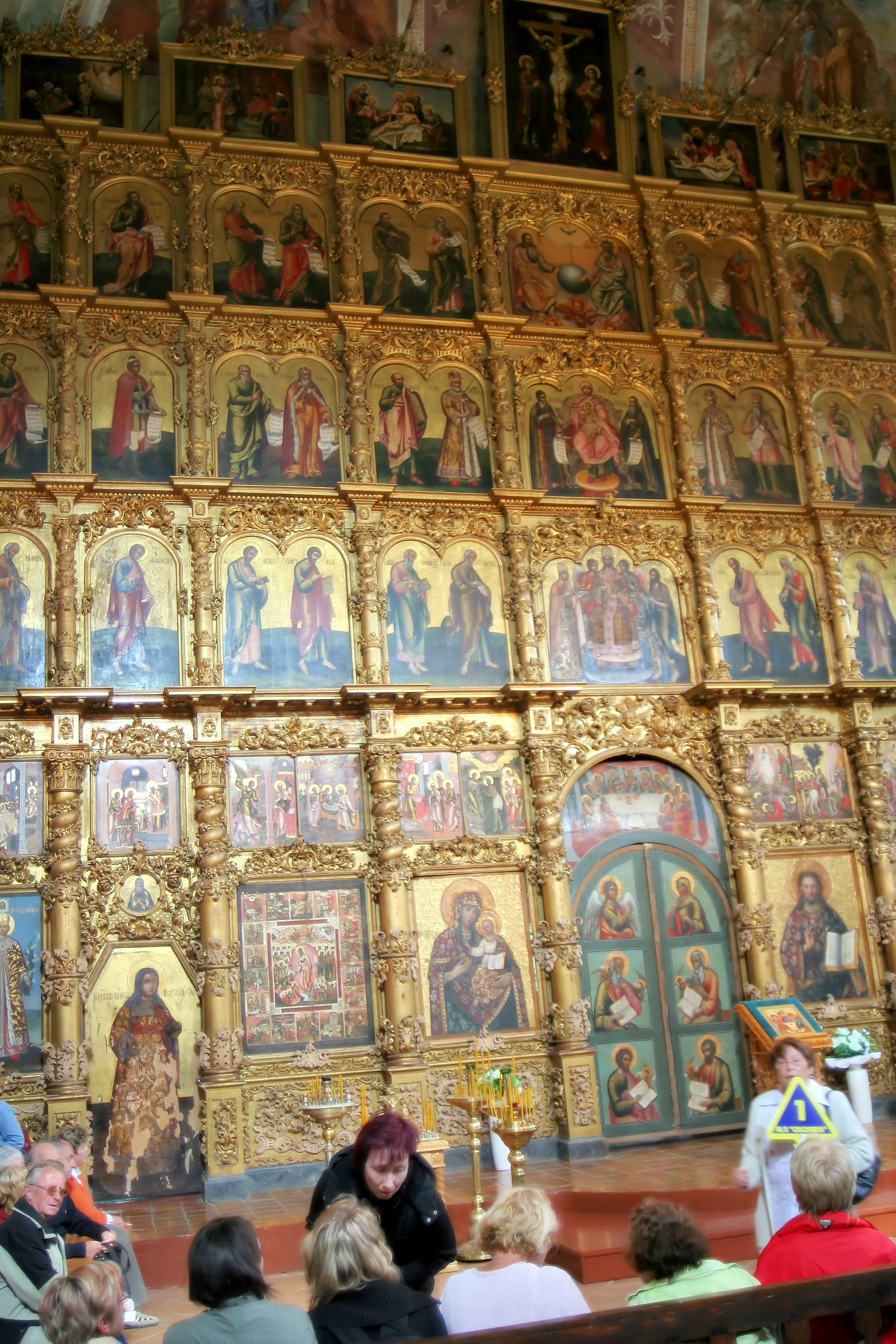
A six-row iconostasis at Uglich Cathedral in Russia. North Deacon's Door (left) and holy doors (right).

Archaeological evidence from the St. John of Stoudios monastery in Constantinople suggests that the iconostasis evolved from the early templon. A basilica dedicated to John the Baptist was built in 463 AD. In it the chancel barrier surrounded the altar in a π shape, with one large door facing the nave and two smaller doors on the other sides. Twelve piers held chancel slabs of about 1.6 meters (5 ft 3 in) in length. The height of the slabs is not known. The chancel barrier was not merely a low parapet (a short wall); remains of colonnettes have been found, suggesting that the barrier carried an architrave on top of the columns.

In early churches, including the Hagia Sophia ("Great Church") in Constantinople, the altar, at least in large churches, was under a ciborium (ciborion: κιβώριον in Greek), usually a structure with four columns and a domed canopy. This had curtains on rods on all four sides, which were closed for sections of the liturgy, as is still performed in the Coptic and Armenian churches (Note: The Orthodox Armenian Apostolic Church and Catholic Armenian Catholic Church); a comparison with the biblical Veil of the Temple was intended. The small domed structures, usually with red curtains, that are often shown near the writing saint in early Evangelist portraits, especially in the East, represent a ciborium, (Note: Bock covers the use and decline of ciborium curtains in considerable detail, though he is an old source.) as do the structures surrounding many manuscript portraits of medieval rulers. As the iconostasis grew, the ciborium declined, although some late examples, by now invisible to the congregation, were produced.

The templon gradually replaced all other forms of chancel barriers in Byzantine churches in the 6th, 7th, and 8th centuries, except in Cappadocia. The invention of the solid icon screen is ascribed to Saint Basil the Great.

As late as the 10th century, a simple wooden chancel barrier separated the apse from the nave in the rock-cut churches in Derinkuyu, although by the late 11th century, the templon had become standard. This may have been because of the veneration and imitation of the Great Church Hagia Sophia in Constantinople, though the columnar form of chancel barrier does predate Hagia Sophia.

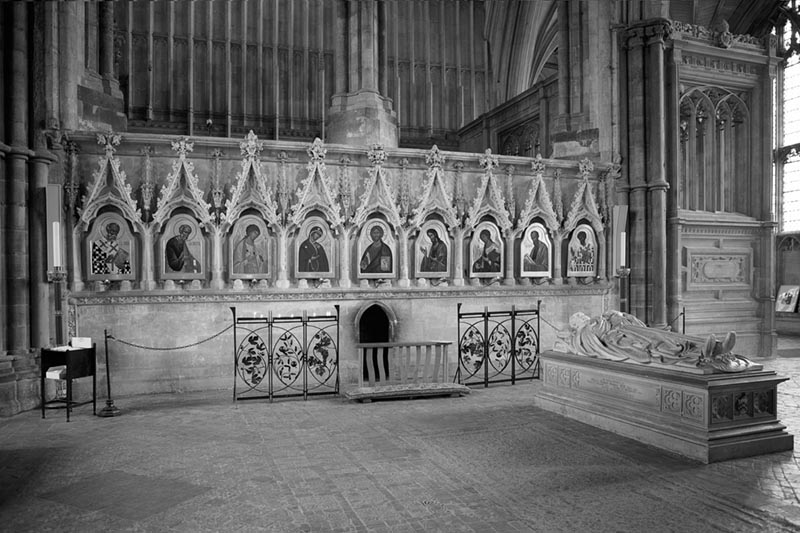
Fedorov's Deesis, recently added to the retroquire screen at Winchester Cathedral, England. The differently situated rood screens of Western medieval churches often achieved an effect comparable to the iconostasis.

The rood screens or pulpita that most large European Roman Catholic churches and cathedrals had acquired by late medieval times occupied a similar position between chancel and nave but served a different function. The choir was usually east of the screen. Many survive, often most completely in Scandinavia, and more were built in the Gothic Revival, particularly in Anglican churches in England. In wooden examples, painted panels were typically waist-high, with a wooden tracery section above allowing a view through, and then a large carved beam supporting a rood cross crucifix, often life-size, above that. Larger churches had stone screens, which might impede virtually all viewing by the congregation.

== See also ==
- Ambon (liturgy)
- Rood screen
- Soleas
- Templon
- Iconostasis of the Cathedral of Hajdúdorog
- Altarpiece
