= Soleas =

Part of Eastern Orthodox church buildings

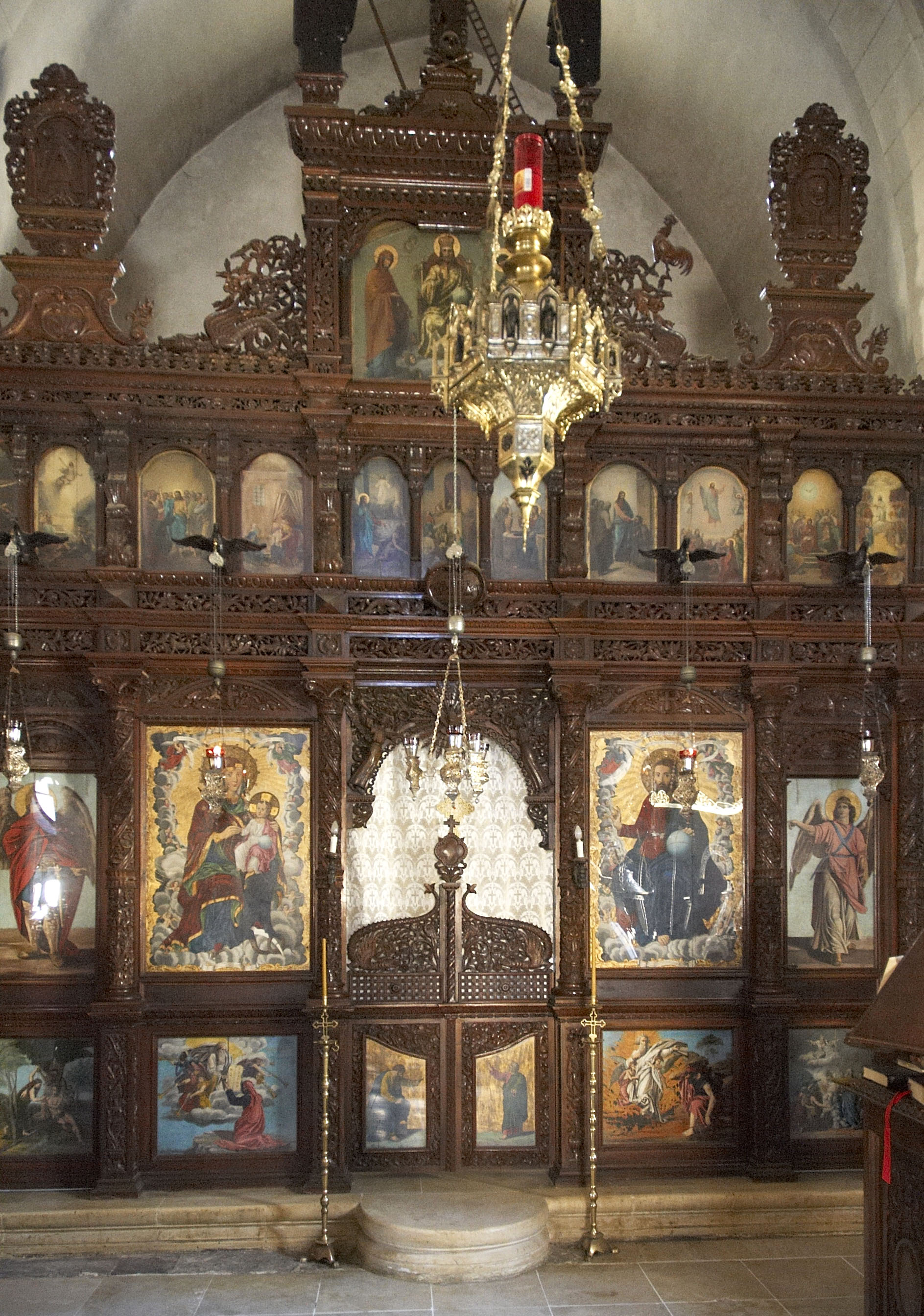
Marble soleas in front of the iconostasis at Moni Arkadiou, Crete

The soleas (Greek: σολέα, other form σολέας) = Latin: solea, meaning "bottom, base", as used in "sole of a shoe", cf. also the "sole" from the resemblance of fish to a flat shoe. Of uncertain origin) is an extension of the sanctuary platform in an Eastern Orthodox temple (church building). The soleas projects beyond the iconostasis, forming a narrow walkway running the full length of the iconostasis.

In the center of the soleas is the ambon, directly in front of the Holy Doors, where the communicants stand to receive Holy Communion and where the clergy come out for public prayers, sermons, etc.

At either side of the soleas are places for two choirs, called the kliros (meaning lots, since in ancient times readers and singers were chosen by lot).

In some major churches in Greece, the soleas sometimes extends far out from the iconostasis into the nave. On it will be two choirs to either side, the bema (pulpit) to one side and the Bishop's throne on the other. The solea will be separated from the main part of the nave by a waist-high wall with icons and a central opening. Liturgically in these churches, the solea will be where the Deacon stands to read the petitions, where the readings will take place and where the people will come to receive communion (by entering the sides of the solea to north and south and leaving through the center opening. While the wall serves to separate the laity from the elevated solea, the laity may still enter to receive communion or to receive blessings from the Bishop on his throne, or at the end of the service to receive holy bread and a blessing from the celebrant.
