= Ambon (liturgy) =

Architectural feature in Eastern Churches

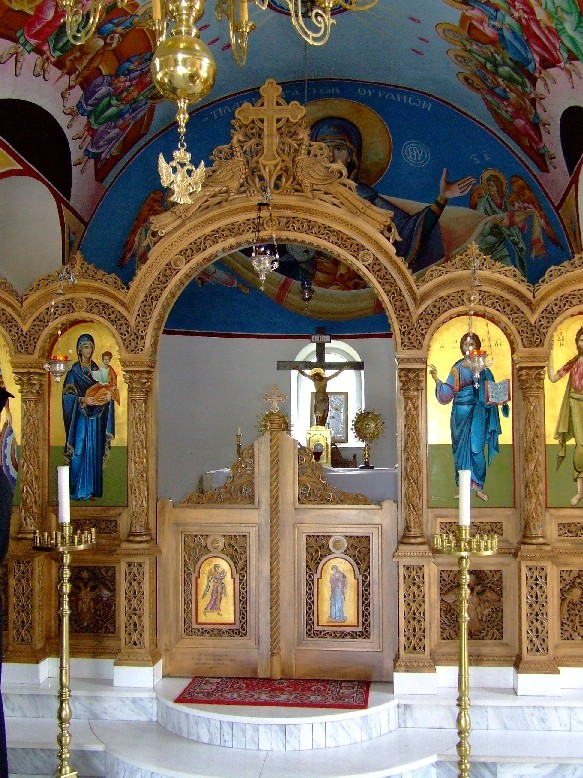
An iconostasis with a rounded stone ambon of two steps (Beloiannisz, Hungary).

The ambon or ambo (Greek: ἄμβων, meaning "pulpit"; Slavonic: amvón) in its modern usage is a projection coming out from the soleas (the walkway in front of the iconostasis) in an Eastern Orthodox, Oriental Orthodox and Eastern Catholic church. The ambon stands directly in front of the Holy Doors. It may be either rounded or square and has one, two, or three steps leading up to it.

== History ==
Originally the ambon was an elevated platform, somewhat variable in location within the church (but typically found toward the center of the nave, or somewhat forward from there), where the scriptures were read during the Divine Liturgy. It is still so used for celebrations of the Liturgy of St James. It is a development from the bimah in the Jewish synagogue.

In the Russian Orthodox Church, during Hierarchical services, the bishop will stand upon a raised platform (kafedra) in the center of the nave like the bimah of old.

Originally used in both the East and West, the structure has almost disappeared in the Western Rites. In early Western churches the ambon was known also as the gradus, lectorium, or lectricium, and from it have developed the lectern and the pulpit. It took the form of a raised stand, approached by steps, for preaching and often for readings. In the West, there were often two ambons, one on the north (for the reading or chanting of the Gospel) and one on the south (for the Epistle) side of the choir or presbytery. Remnants of the ambo may be found at the Basilica of St Clement in Rome and in St Mark's Basilica in Venice.

In the Roman Catholic Church the stand from which the Gospel is read is formally called the "ambo" (not "ambon"). It is normally in the form of a lectern or pulpit, and located near the front of the chancel.

== Usage ==
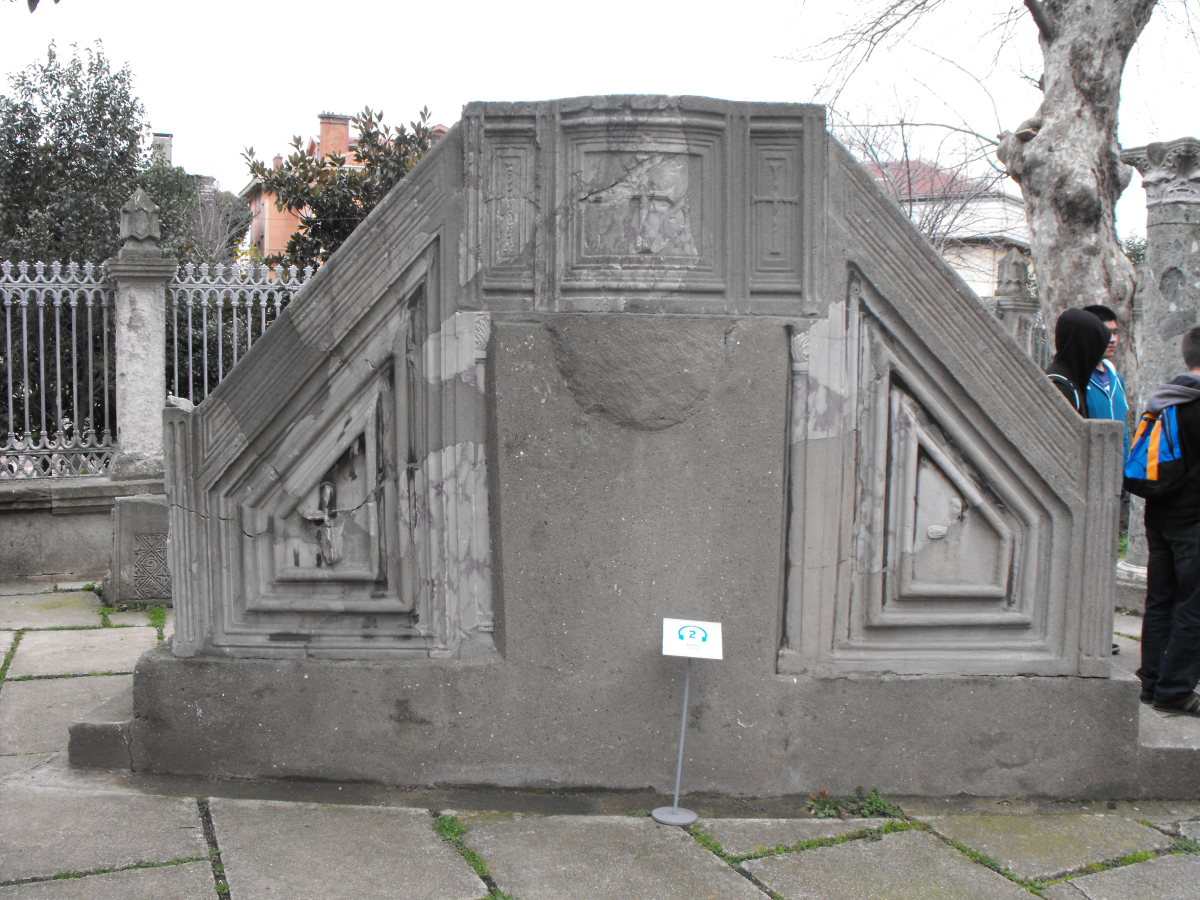
Ancient ambon outside Hagia Sophia in Constantinople (Istanbul, Turkey)

The ambon is the platform from which the deacon reads the Gospel and says the litanies, and the priest gives the dismissal during the Divine Services.

The ambon is considered to be a part of the altar (i.e., the sanctuary), so normally only the clergy will go up onto the ambon. The exception is that the faithful will step up onto the ambon when they come forward to receive Holy Communion. During the Rite of the Churching of Women, the newborn infant is taken by the priest up onto the ambon (provided the child has been baptized by this time—otherwise, this ceremony will wait until after the baptism). If the child is female, the priest lays her in front of the icon of the Theotokos; if it is a male, the priest takes the child around the Holy Table (altar).

In some Greek Orthodox parishes, there is an ambo to the side (usually the Liturgical North, opposite the Bishop's throne) of the Iconostasis. It retains only a few of the functions of the ancient ambo, whereas the solea retains the other functions. The Epistle and Homily are read from this ambon (similar to a western pulpit), whereas the Gospel is read from the Solea. The practice of vesting the Bishop in the center of the nave is retained in parishes without chairs or pews. If the parish has chairs and pews, then the vesting of the Bishop occurs near the iconostasis, sometimes on the solea/ambon itself.

The last public prayer of the Divine Liturgy is the "Prayer Before the Ambon" (Greek: euche opisthambonos), originally a prayer of thanksgiving said as the clergy descended the ambon at the end of the service. In ancient times, there was a large collection of Prayers Before the Ambon, written for the different Feast Days of the church year and for those occasional services (Weddings, Funerals, etc.) that called for a celebration of the Divine Liturgy. In some Orthodox Churches this more extensive collection of prayers is used.

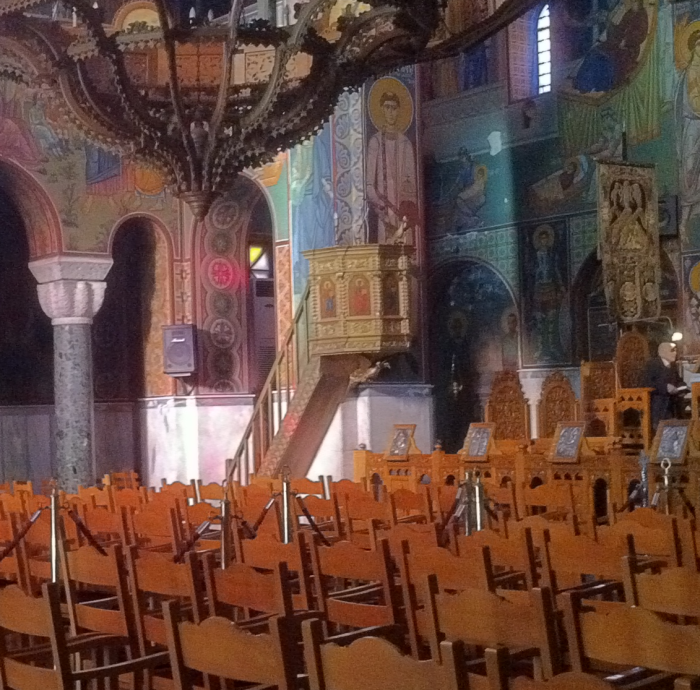
Contemporary Greek Ambon, which is similar to the Western pulpit, and retains only some of the functions of the ancient ambon (Volos, Greece).

== See also ==
- Ambon of Henry II
- Bema
- Central pulpit
- Kliros
- Templon
- Tribune (architecture)
