= Russian Orthodox Diocese of Smolensk =

Diocese of Smolensk
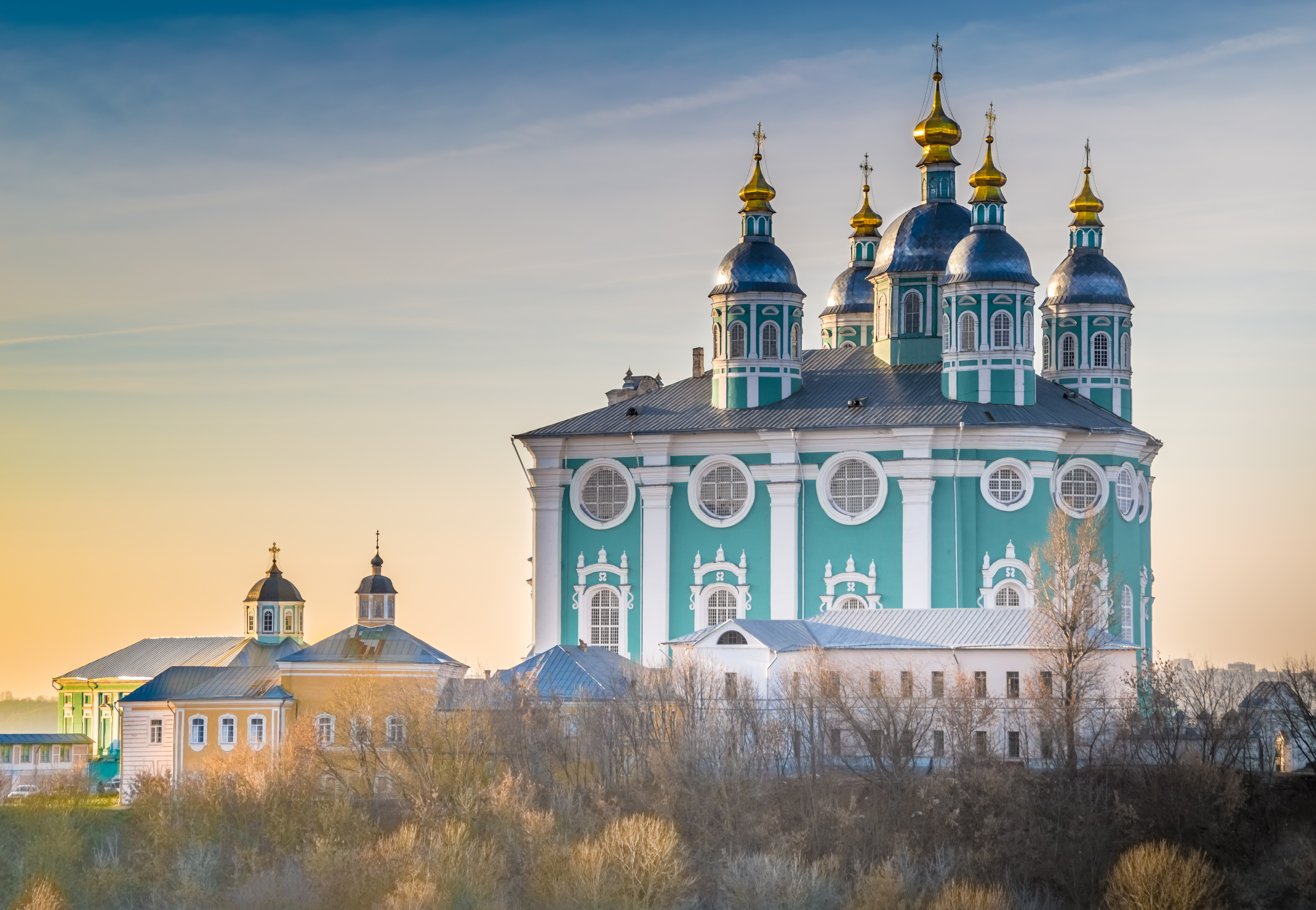
- Dormition Cathedral in Smolensk

Location
- Headquarters: Smolensk

Information
- Denomination: Eastern Orthodox
- Sui iuris church: Russian Orthodox Church
- Established: 1137
- Governance: Eparchy

Website
- smoleparh.ru

The Diocese of Smolensk (Russian: Смоленская епархия) is an eparchy of the Russian Orthodox Church with its center in Smolensk. It was founded in 1137.

In 2015 Diocese of Vyazma was separated from the Diocese of Smolensk; the Smolensk and Vyazma dioceses were included to the newly formed Metropolitanate of Smolensk. In 2017 the Diocese of Roslavl was also separated from the Diocese of Smolensk and included to the Metropolitanate of Smolensk

Current head of this diocese is metropolitan Isidore Tupikin since 2015.
