= Ambon of Henry II =

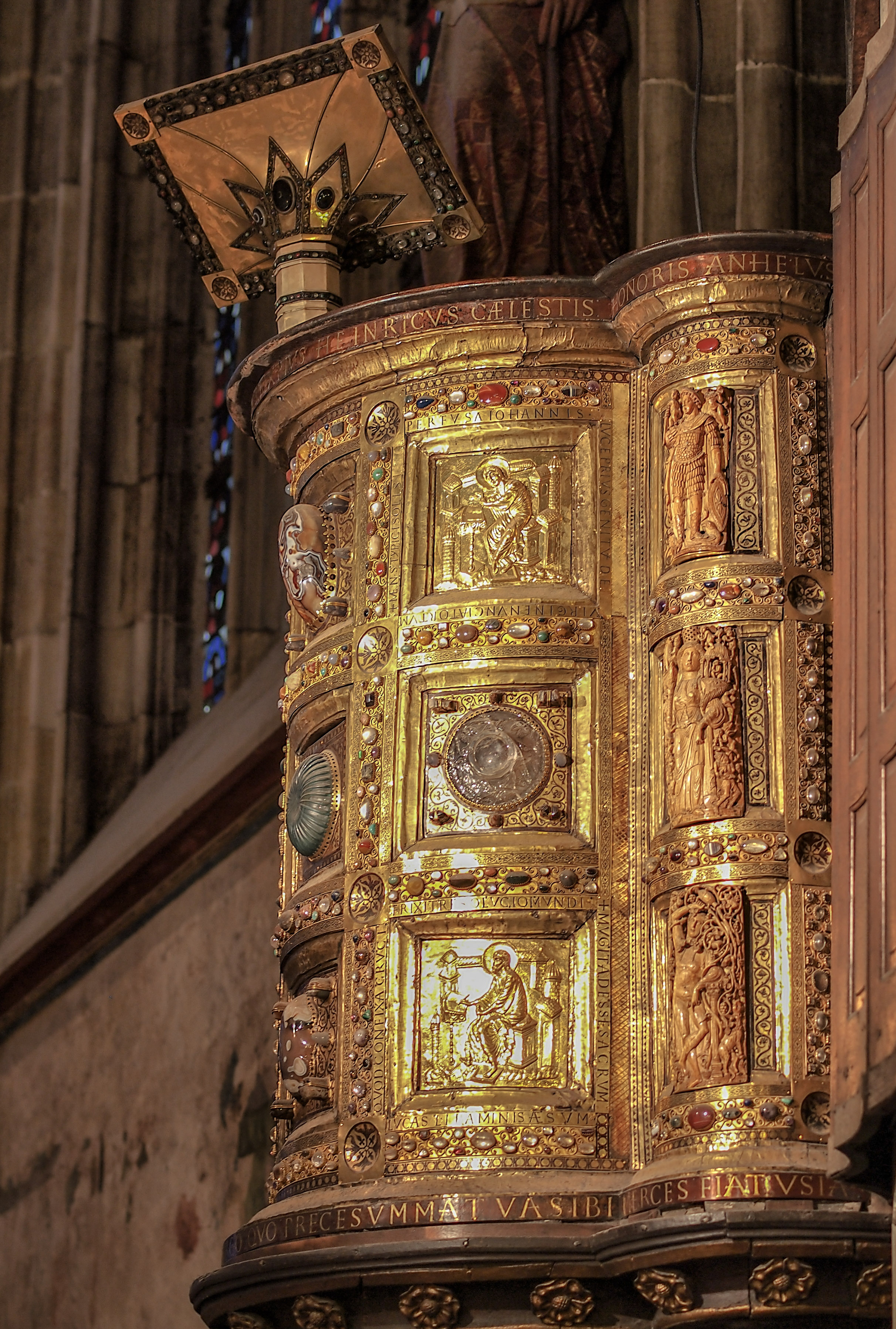
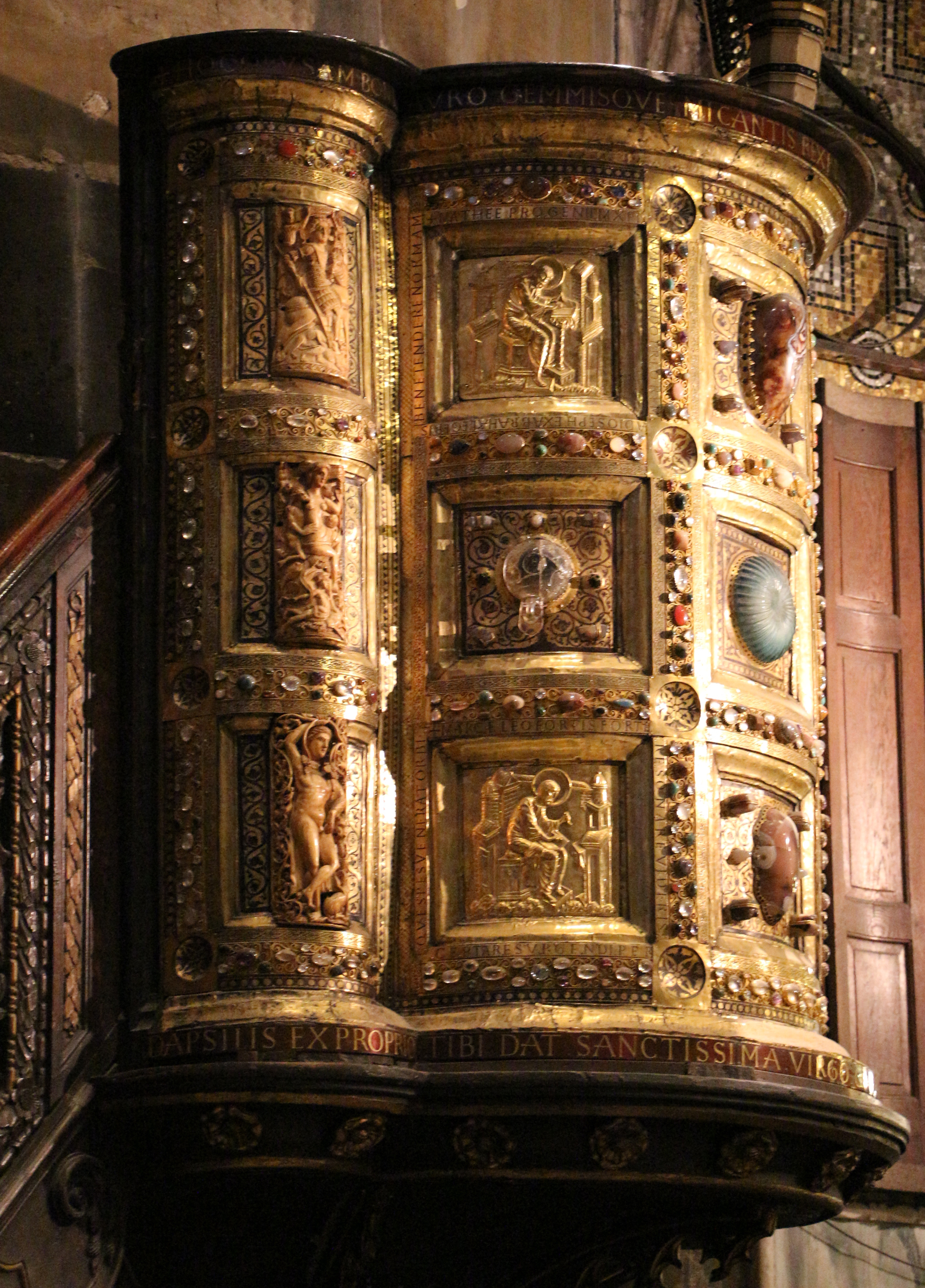
The Ambon of Henry II in Aachen Cathedral

The Ambon of Henry II (German: Ambo Heinrichs II.), commonly known as Henry's Ambon (Heinrichsambo) or Henry's Pulpit (Heinrichskanzel) is an ambon in the shape of a pulpit built by Henry II, Holy Roman Emperor in the Palatine chapel in Aachen (now Aachen Cathedral) between 1002 and 1014. It is among the most significant artworks of the Ottonian period.

Originally, the Ambon probably stood on the central axis of the Octagon, in front of the high altar. After the expansion of the Choir was completed in 1414, the Ambon was moved to the south side of the first bay. The wooden staircase was built in 1782. The ambon underwent restoration work in 1816/7, 1924, and 1939. The ambon remains in liturgical use on high feast days.

== Description ==
=== Construction, decoration and arrangement ===
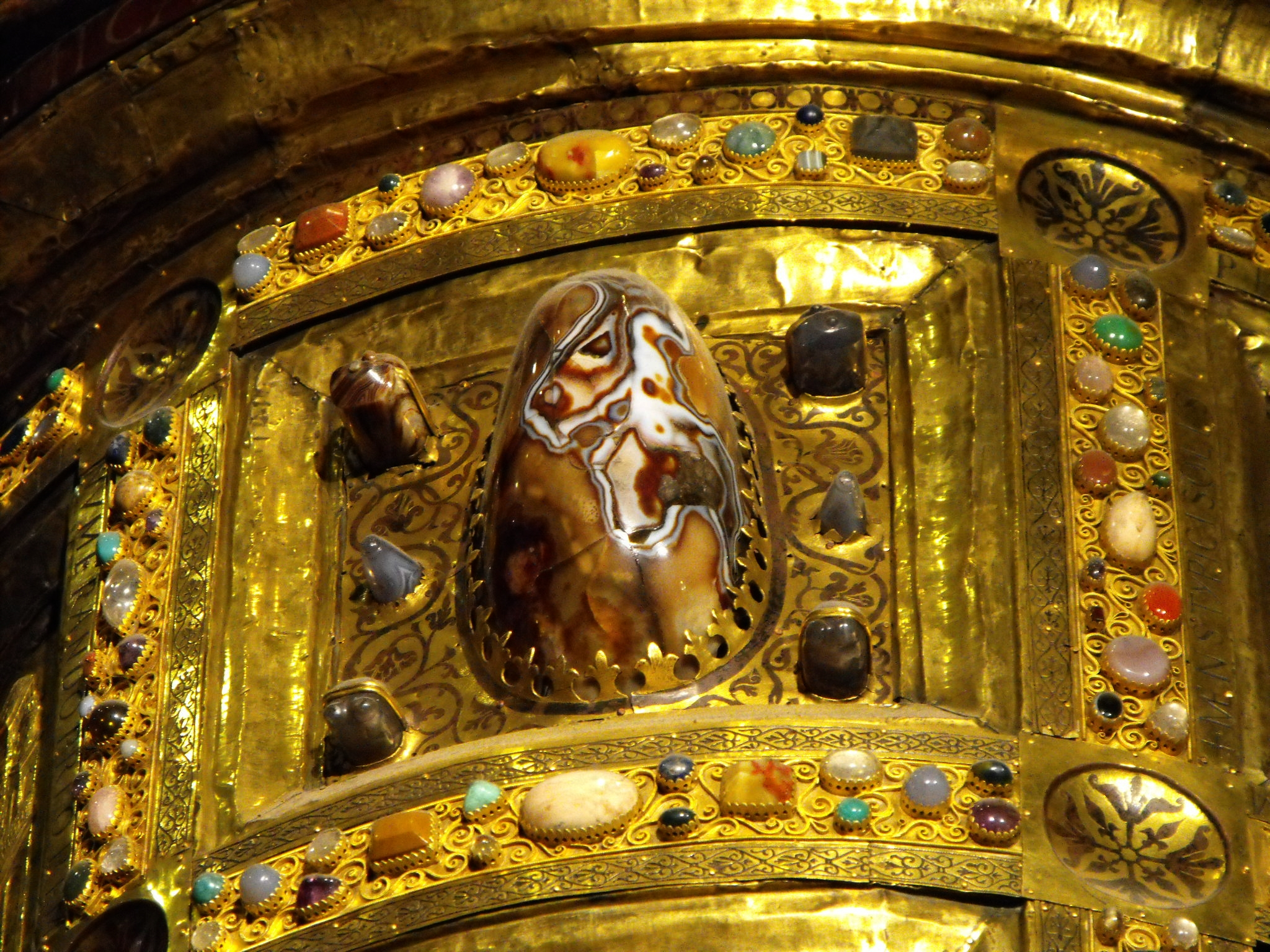
Detail: the ancient agate bowl

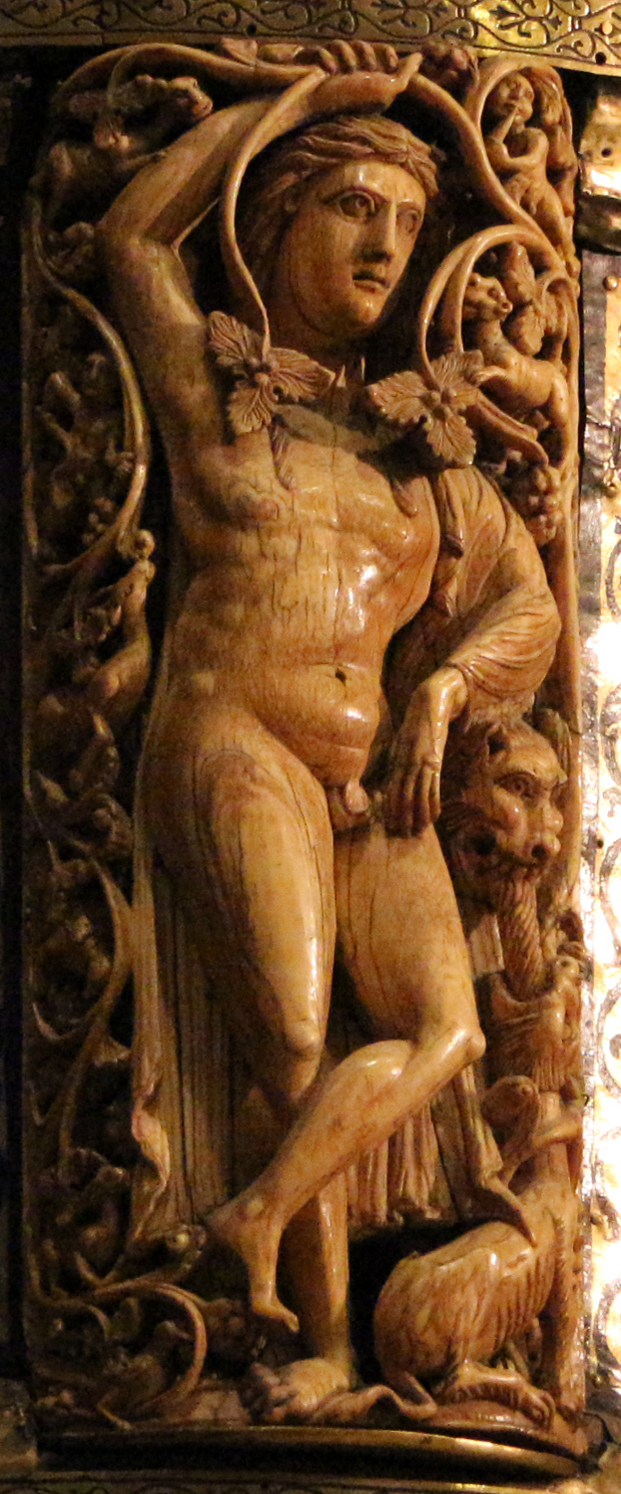
Detail: ivory plaque

The ambon has a trefoil floorplan. The wall of the central portion is divided into nine rectangles decorated with lacquer by borders of filigree and precious stones (only one of these borders is original), five of which have a crux gemmata in the shape of a Greek cross. Costly materials decorate these panels – three are original, two are later. The original pieces include an ancient agate bowl, which probably dates from the third or fourth century AD. How Henry II came into possession of this agate bowl is not known for certain, but the sources report that Byzantine delegations brought him gifts. According to one view in the scholarship, it was part of the dowry of Theophanu – the bride of Otto II. There is also a rock crystal cup and bowl which are probably Eastern work of the late tenth or eleventh century AD. Such rock crystal work found very great popularity north of the Alps and was soon imported from the Eastern Mediterranean in great quantity. A green ribbed bowl and another agate bowl are later additions. Agate and Chalcedon chessmen surround the crockery. In the other four panels there are chased copper reliefs depicting the Four Evangelists writing the gospels. Only the panel showing Matthew (upper left) is original; the other three reliefs were cast from plaster models in the 1870s. Both the central wall and the columnar bulges on each side are decorated with many bronze panels decorated with foliage patterns.

There is very unusual decoration on the side portions – six convex ivory tablets made in Alexandria or elsewhere in Egypt in the sixth century AD. The top tablets on both sides show martial victory scenes. On each, two Genii crown the central figure. In the right panel, the warrior stands ready for battle while in left panel he is on horseback, striking an armoured dragon in the heart with a lance. Another tablet shows the Nereids, the daughters of the Greek sea god Nereus and his wife Doris and attendants of Poseidon riding on marine animals. On a fourth panel there is a crowned, finely dressed goddess holding a ship in her right hand and a cornucopia in her left, which flows into a small temple with a small child looking out. The dome of this temple is decorated with angels playing music. This goddess could be seen as a personification of the city of Alexandria or of Tyche, the daughter of Zeus and the goddess of chance, controlling the ship of life. Her crown and the child also allow an identification with Isis, the Egyptian goddess of love and the sea, who is often depicted as a mother goddess, holding her son lovingly in her hands. A Maenads dancing to the sound of the aulos and pan pipes of Pan at the feet of the goddess looks forward to the panel below depicting Dionysus, the Greek wine-god, known for his unbridled, intoxicating revels. Casually leaning on a column with his legs crossed, he grasps the vine leaf surrounding him and swinging a pot over his head pours a wid arc of wine down a lion's throat. A small angel and other fantastic creatures pass by. The drunk god is found in very similar circumstances on two of the six tablets.

The use of ancient motifs and elements in art is a major justification for the (not undisputed) term "Ottonian Renaissance" to which the ambon, with its unique design, can be assigned.

=== Inscriptions ===
On the upper and lower bands of the ambon, running from the left side all the way to the right, is a metrical dedication inscription which identifies Henry II (called "Pious King Henry") as the donor in four Leonine verses directed to the Virgin Mary. Only fragments of the original text survive, but in the restorations of 1939 it was possible to restore it using written sources, so that the full verse is now readable:

[HOC] OPVS AMBONIS AVRO [GEMMISQVE MICANTIS REX PI]VS HEINRICVS CELAE[STIS HONORIS ANHELVS DAPSILIS EX PROPRIO TIBI DAT SANCTISSIMA VIRGO QVO PRE]CE SVMMA TVA SIBI [MERCES FIAT VSIA]	This ambon of gold and glittering gems, Pious King Henry, overwhelmed by heavenly honours And wealthy, gives to you, most holy virgin, from his own property, That by your prayer the highest [grace might come] to him.

The inscriptions of the Four Evangelist reliefs are also in Leonine hexameters. The couplets say:

Matthew	+ MATHEE PROGENIEM (CHRISTI) | NVMERANDO PRIOREM | AD IOSEPH EX ABRAHA(M) LEGERIS | BENE TENDERE NORMAM	Matthew, you were well chosen to keep the rule by enumerating the prior generations (of Christ) – from Abraham to Joseph.
Mark	+ MARCE LEO FORTIS FORTE(M) | RESONARE VIDERIS | CERTA RESVRGENDI PER | QVE(M) SPES VENERAT ORBI	Mark the Lion, you are seen to repeat the fortune of fortunes: the sure resurrection through which the hope of the globe has come.
Luke	+ MVGIT ADESSE SACRVM | LVCAS LIBAMINIS AESVM | QVOD CONFIXA CRVCI | FRIXIT RESOLVCIO MVNDI	Luke bellows that the holy sacrificial houseleek is here, since the salvation of the world has roasted, nailed to the cross.
John	+ MENS TYPICI SOLIS [RADIO] | PERFVSA JOHANNIS | LVCE PRIVS GENITVM DE | VIRGINE NVNCIAT ORTVM	The mind of John poured out in a sun-like [ray], announces that he who was once begotten in light has been born from a virgin.

== Theological and symbolic message ==
The reuse of profane art and culture for its own purposes was common in Christianity from the beginning. Thus the message of the triumph of the Christian message over heathenism can also be seen in the use of the panels in the ambon: previously worldly artworks were made into constitutive parts of the ambon as a sacred place for the proclamation of the Good News. On another view, the Ambon of Henry II could be understood in its entirety as an eclectically designed attempt to put its foreign elements of diverse origin in the context of the Medieval Christian world view and to integrate them in this single object.

== Bibliography ==
Critical Editions of the Inscriptions

- Karl Strecker with Norbert Fickermann (ed.): Die Ottonenzeit (= MGH Poetae Latini, Vol. 5, 2). Hiersemann, Leipzig 1939, p. 357 (Digitalised).
- Helga Giersiepen: Die Inschriften des Aachener Doms (= Die Deutschen Inschriften, Vol. 31). Reichert, Wiesbaden 1992, ISBN 3-88226-511-6, pp. 17–18 No. 19 (Online).

Art Historical Studies

- Erika Doberer. "Studien zu dem Ambo Kaiser Heinrichs II. im Dom zu Aachen." In: Karolingische und ottonische Kunst. Werden, Wesen, Wirkung. Steiner, Wiesbaden 1957, pp. 308–359.
- Horst Appuhn. "Das Mittelstück vom Ambo König Heinrichs II. in Aachen." Aachener Kunstblätter 32, 1966, pp. 70–73.
- Ernst Günther Grimme. Der Aachener Domschatz. 2nd Edition. Schwann, Düsseldorf 1973, pp. 38–43.
- Ernst Günther Grimme. Der Dom zu Aachen. Architektur und Ausstattung. Einhard, Aachen 1994, pp. 107–114.
- Herta Lepie, Georg Minkenberg. Die Schatzkammer des Aachener Domes. Einhard, Aachen 1995, pp. 38–39.
- Wolfgang Cortjaens. "Die Evangelistenreliefs vom Ambo Heinrichs II. ein „Modell-Fall“ des 19. Jahrhunderts." Aachener Kunstblätter 61, 1995/97 (1998), pp. 429–447.
- Silke Schomburg. Der Ambo Heinrichs II. im Aachener Dom. Dissertation, Technische Hochschule Aachen 1998.
- Herta Lepie, Ann Münchow. Elfenbeinkunst aus dem Aachener Domschatz. Imhof, Petersberg 2006, ISBN 3-86568-000-3, pp. 26–58.
- Ernst Günther Grimme: Der goldene Dom der Ottonen. Einhard, Aachen 2001, ISBN 3-930701-90-1, pp. 69, 72–80.

Theological Studies

- Albert Damblon. Ab-kanzeln gilt nicht. Zur Geschichte und Wirkung christlicher Predigtorte. (= Ästhetik – Theologie – Liturgik, Vol. 27) LIT, Münster 2003, ISBN 3-8258-6663-7, S. 24–27 (Excerpts on Google Books).
- Hans Jürgen Roth. Ein Abbild des Himmels. Der Aachener Dom – Liturgie, Bibel, Kunst. Thouet, Aachen 2011, pp. 75–82.
