= Bugabashevo =

Bugabashevo Бугабашево
- Selo
- Location within Bashkortostan Location within Russia
- Coordinates: 55°03′N 53°55′E
- Country: Russia
- Region: Bashkortostan
- District: Bakalinsky District
- Time zone: UTC+5:00

Bugabashevo (Russian: Бугабашево; Bashkir: Буғабаш, Buğabaş) is a rural locality (a selo) in Mikhaylovsky Selsoviet, Bakalinsky District, Bashkortostan, Russia. The population was 185 as of 2010. There are 2 streets.

== Geography ==
Bugabashevo is located 20 km southeast of Bakaly (the district's administrative centre) by road. Mikhaylovka is the nearest rural locality.
