= Dormition Cathedral in Smolensk =

Church in Russia

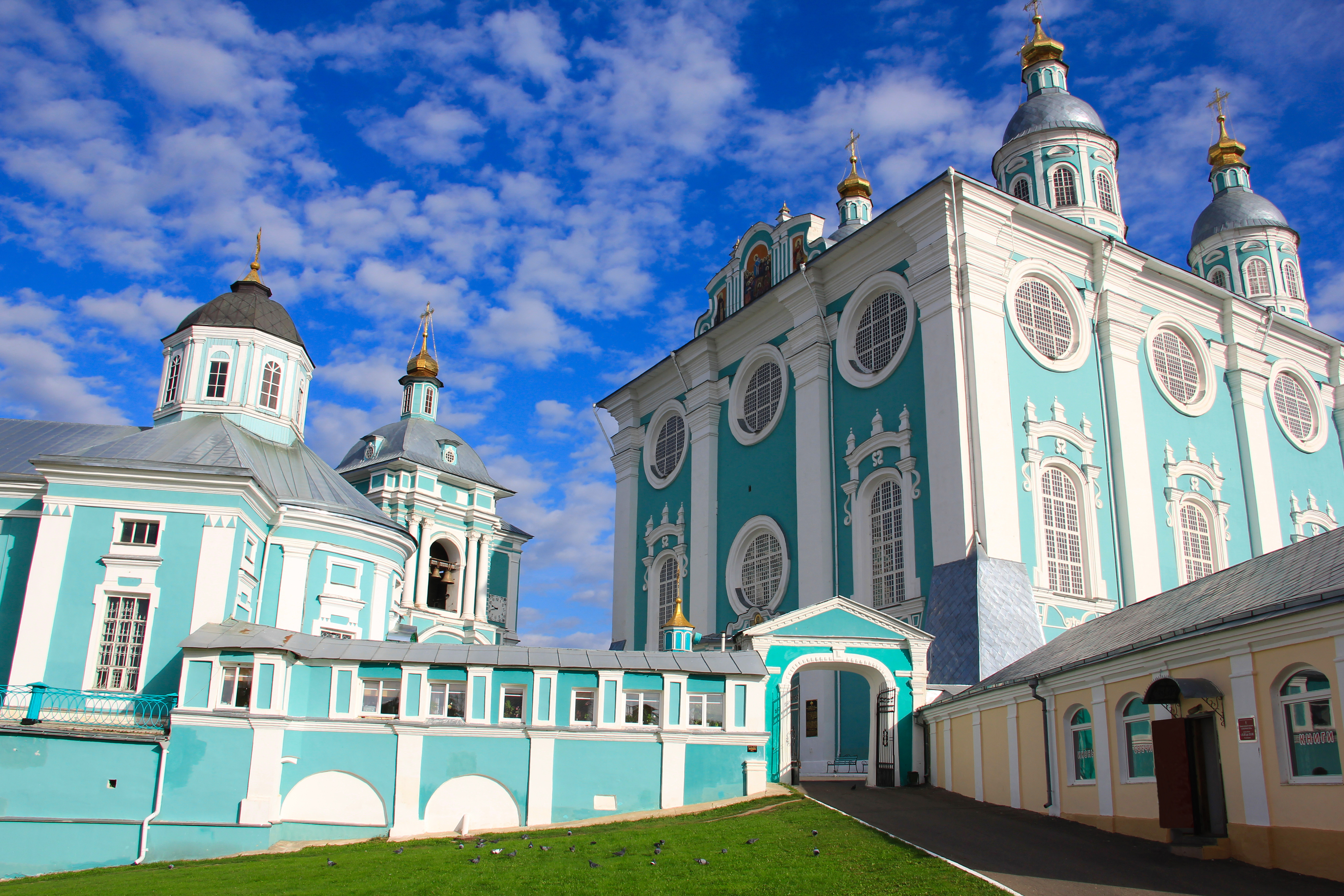

Religion
- Affiliation: Russian Orthodox
- Ecclesiastical or organizational status: Russian Orthodox Diocese of Smolensk

Location
- Location: Smolensk, Smolensk Oblast Russia
- Interactive map of Dormition Cathedral in Smolensk
- Coordinates: 54°47′20″N 32°3′16″E

Architecture
- Architect: Russian architect
- Style: Russian Baroque
- Groundbreaking: 1677
- Completed: 1740

The Cathedral Church of the Dormition (Russian: Успенский собор), dominating the city of Smolensk, Russia, from Cathedral Hill, has been the principal church of the Smolensk bishopric for 800 years.

== Monomakh Cathedral ==
The first brick church on the spot was started by Vladimir Monomakh in 1101. The large six-pillared edifice, similar to Monomakh's cathedral in Vladimir, took several decades to complete. It was finally consecrated during the reign of Vladimir's grandson Rostislav of Smolensk in 1150. In the course of the following 500 years, the church survived numerous wars and fires. Especially serious was the damage inflicted during the great siege of Smolensk (1609–1611).

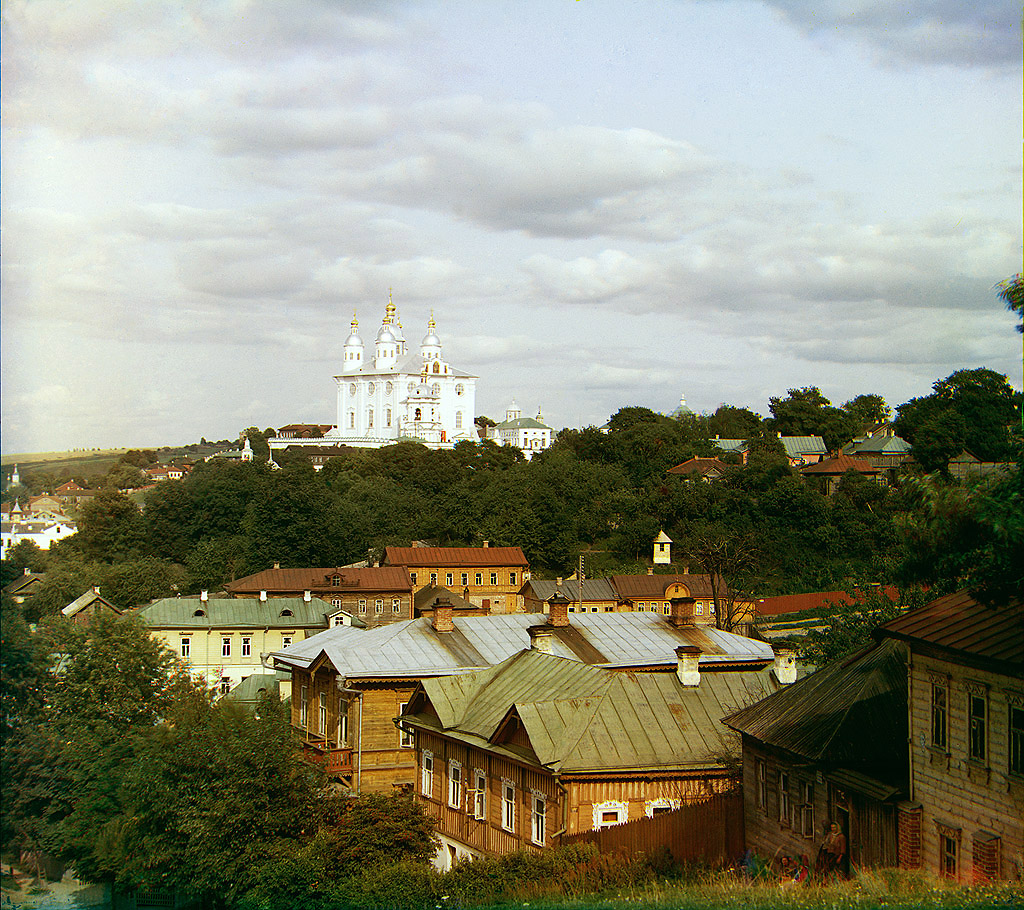
The Dormition cathedral as seen from the distance in 1911.

According to the official legend, the remaining defenders of the city locked themselves in the cathedral and then set fire to the gunpowder in the ammunition depot in the church's basement on June 3, 1611. The explosion that followed caused the roof to collapse, killing all the people inside, who preferred death to being taken prisoner by the Poles. It is unclear, though, what happened in reality except that the ammunition depot in the basement really did explode. It was not unusual in medieval Russia for civilians to seek asylum in churches when a city was overrun, so it was likely civilians, rather than defenders, who died in that explosion. What caused the explosion will probably forever remain an open question: it could have been a Masada-style suicide but it might well have been an accident.

The old cathedral survived the explosion, however. On September 9, 1627, the bishop Lew Rzewuski pleaded Lew Sapieha to preclude "the 500-year-old church" from being converted into a Roman Catholic church, which would violate the terms of Smolensk's surrender to the Poles in 1611. In a 1636 engraving, the cathedral is represented as being covered with a temporary wooden roof.

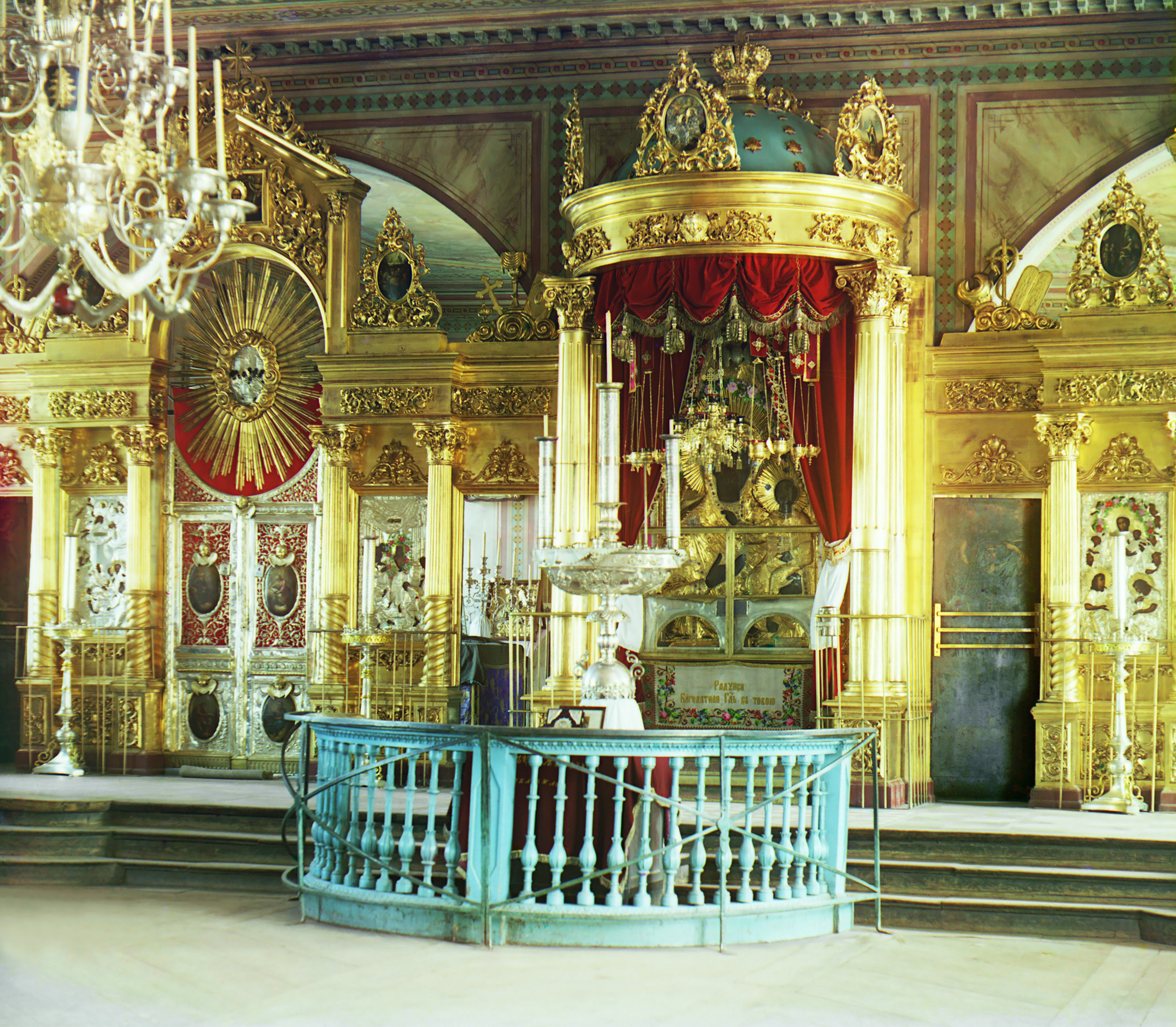
The cathedral shrine of the Theotokos of Smolensk in 1912

After Smolensk was recaptured by the tsars and recognized as belonging to Russia in the 1667 peace treaty, the Russian voivode Prince Repnin was commissioned to inspect the cathedral and to prepare a list of urgent repairs. In 1673 the archbishop of Smolensk was authorized to restore the roof and the domes without damaging its original walls. The ancient bricks, however, proved too dilapidated to put to good use. The old cathedral was completely demolished between May 5 and July 13, 1674.

== New cathedral ==
The current six-pillared, five-domed edifice was constructed over a period of almost 100 years due to flaws in the original design and its implementation – at one point one of the walls collapsed – but it was eventually completed in 1772. The building’s Baroque design is impressive, especially looking up from the base of a wall. Viewed from certain locations it often looks as if it is suspended in the air because it is situated on hill surrounded by trees, concealing the base of the building.

One of the most notable views is inside the cathedral, namely the iconostasis that separates the altar from the nave area of the cathedral, which stands almost the height of the interior space. On it there are icons and interspaced with intricate gold-covered wooden decorations including figures of cherubim and columns entwined with vine branches.

According to local legend, when Napoleon Bonaparte entered the cathedral after Smolensk had fallen to the French army in 1812, he looked up at the altar wall and proclaimed that if any one of his soldiers dared to steal anything from it, he would personally kill that man. The cathedral sustained enormous damage during World War II, when the 11th-century miraculous icon of Theotokos of Smolensk perished in a great fire.

The cathedral appears in Christian Bot's 2013 novel When we were Heroes, in the context of the 1812 Battle of Smolensk.
