= Royal doors =

Doors of the iconostasis in churches

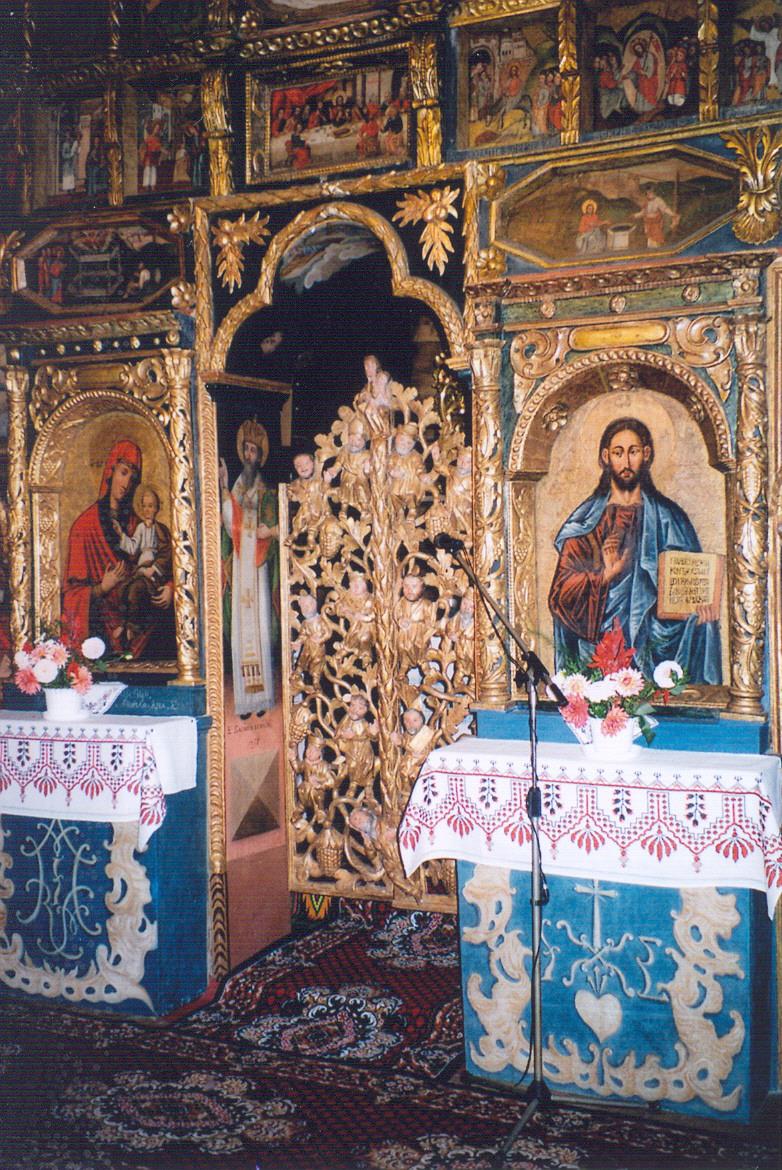
Gilded Royal Doors carved to represent the Tree of Life (Old wooden church in Chotyniec, Poland).

The royal doors, holy doors, or beautiful gates are the central doors of the iconostasis in an Eastern Orthodox or Eastern Catholic church. The sanctuary (sometimes called the Altar, which contains the Holy Table) is separated from the nave by a wooden screen called the iconostasis. The iconostasis represents Christian continuity from the veil of the Temple in Jerusalem which separated the people from the Holy of Holies that housed the Ark of the Covenant. Normally, the iconostasis has three doors in it. The two single doors to the right and left are called "deacons' doors" or "angel doors" and they usually have on them icons of either sainted deacons (Saint Stephen, Saint Lawrence, etc.) or the Archangels Michael and Gabriel. These are the doors that the clergy will normally use when entering the sanctuary. The central double doors are the "holy doors" (Slavonic: Svyatýa Vratá), which are considered to be most sacred, and may only be entered at certain sacred moments during the services, and only by ordained clergy (deacons, priests, bishops).

The term Royal Doors (Greek: Ωραία Πύλη: Slavonic: Tsárskiya Vratá) is commonly used to describe the Holy Doors, because Christ passes through these gates during the Great Entrance at the Divine Liturgy (and most especially during the Liturgy of the Presanctified Gifts). More properly, however, these doors should be called the "Beautiful Gate", and in Greek this is the only term used, although the official English sites of the Ecumenical Patriarchate, the Orthodox Church in America and the Antiochian Orthodox Church all use the term "Royal Doors". In Russia, they are sometimes called the "Red Gates", red being synonymous with beautiful.

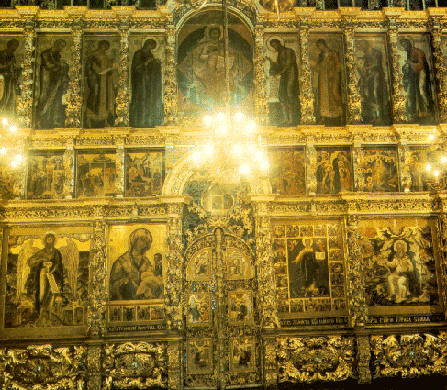
Seventeenth-century iconostasis of Prophet Elias church, Yaroslavl. The Beautiful Gates are in the center.

Whatever its name, a typical gate consists of two hinged doors. Often they will be only half-height, but sometimes they go almost all the way to the top of the opening. The doors themselves are made of wood or metal and usually have painted on them an icon of the Annunciation in the form of a diptych (the Theotokos on the right door, and the Archangel Gabriel on the left), either alone or with the four Evangelists. Other icons may be used also. The doors may be intricately carved and gilded, and are almost always topped by a cross.

Theologically the Holy Doors represent the gates of Jerusalem, through which Christ entered on Palm Sunday. They also represent the entrance to the Heavenly Jerusalem. In the Russian practice, there are detailed rules as to when the doors are to be opened during Vespers, Matins, and the Divine Liturgy. When the gates are opened, it represents moments when God is especially present to his people, such as during the reading of the Gospel, or when the faithful are receiving Holy Communion. Most of the time the doors are closed. This is symbolic of penitence, a reminder that sin separates the individual from God.

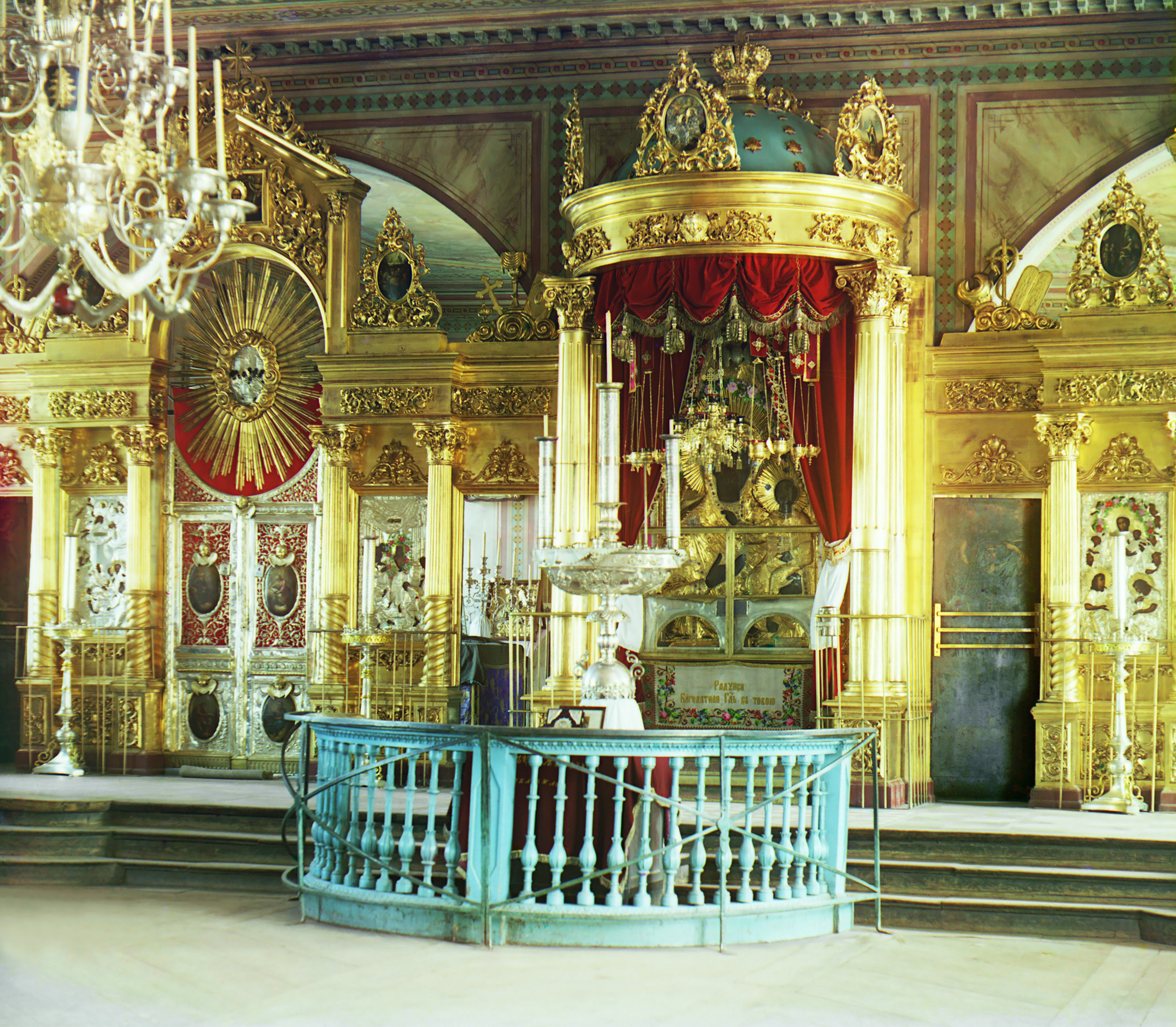
Elaborate Holy Doors (left) in the Chapel of the Wonderworking Icon of the Theotokos of Smolensk in the Dormition Cathedral, Smolensk, Russia

There is also a curtain or veil, scored to remind that in the Temple in Jerusalem, behind the Holy Doors which is opened and closed at specific times during the services. While the veil is always open whenever the Holy Doors are opened, sometimes when the Holy Doors are closed, the rubrics call for the veil to be opened. The curtain is usually more plainly decorated. Alternatively a sliding panel depicting "Christ the Great High Priest" may take place of the doors and curtain and certain churches may have no physical barrier at all.

Only the higher clergy (bishops, priests, and deacons) are permitted to go through the Holy Doors, and even they may only pass through them when it is prescribed by the liturgical rubrics.

During Bright Week (the week following Easter Sunday), the Holy Doors and veil remain open the entire week. During this time, the open doors symbolize the open Tomb of Christ. The Epitaphios (icon representing the burial shroud of Christ) is visible on top of the Holy Table (altar table) through the open Holy Doors as a witness of the Resurrection. During Bright Week, the clergy, who would normally use the Deacons Doors to go in and out of the sanctuary, will always enter and exit through the Holy Doors

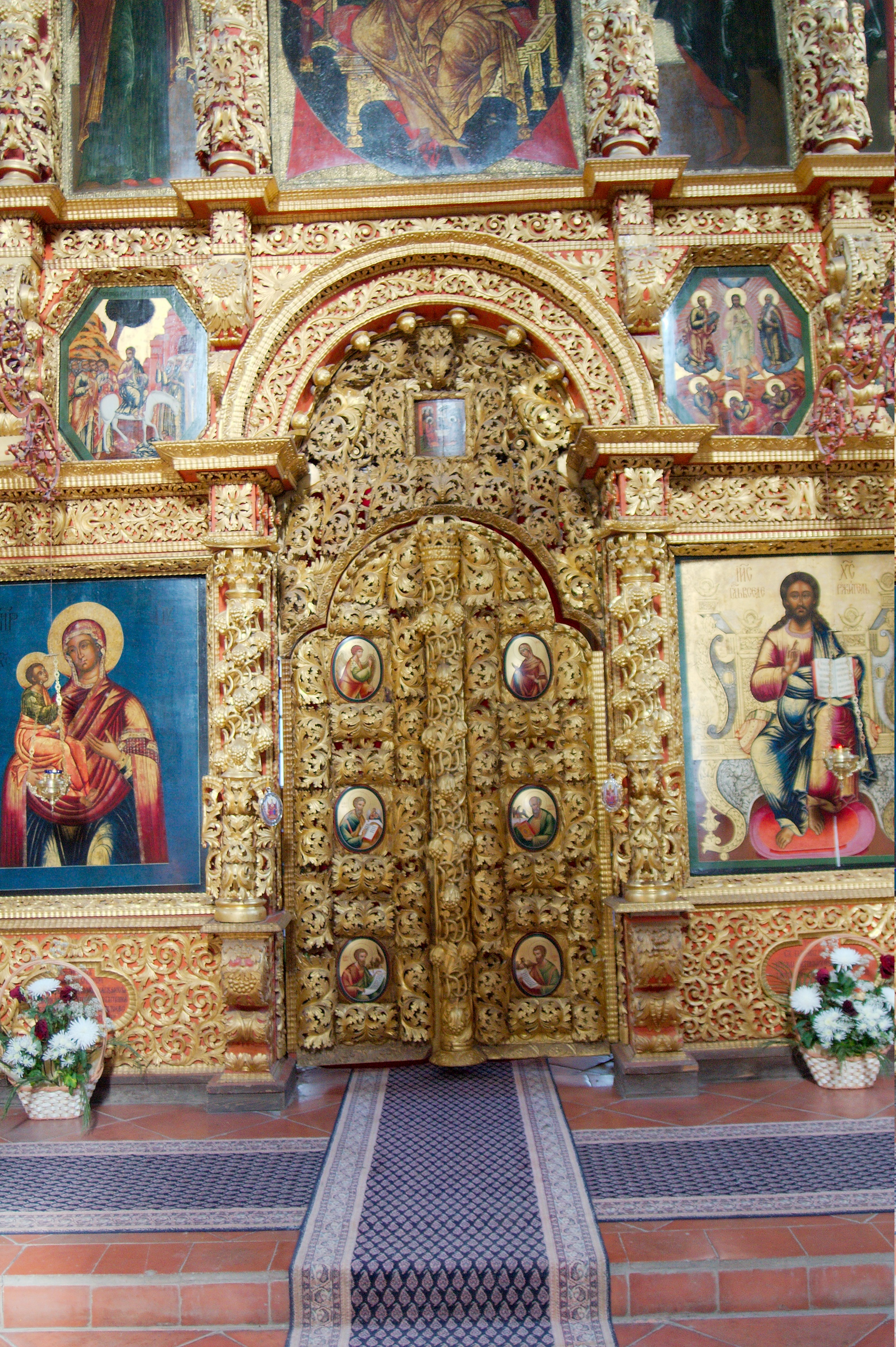
Ornate Holy Doors at Ipatiev Monastery, Kostroma, Russia. The six medallions on the doors depict the Annunciation (upper right: Theotokos, upper left: Gabriel) and the Four Evangelists.

When a bishop serves the Divine Liturgy, the Holy Doors and veil are left open for the entire service (except during the communion of the clergy). The bishop will always pass through the Holy Doors, even at times when priests or deacons cannot. If the rubrics call for the Holy Doors to be closed, they will be opened for him to pass through, and then immediately closed again.

In addition to referring to the Holy Doors, the term royal doors can also (and more properly) refer to either of the following:

- Most correctly, the term royal doors indicates the large central doors that separate the narthex from the nave. This is the formal entrance to the church proper (i.e. the nave) and was, in former times, the ceremonial entrance of the Emperor, hence the epithet 'royal'. In current use, these doors are used by all although monasteries and some parish churches use the doors liturgically as the point where the abbot or a bishop vests before making a formal entrance.
