= Tonary =

Liturgical book in Western Christianity

A tonary is a liturgical book in the Western Christian Church which lists by incipit various items of Gregorian chant according to the Gregorian mode (tonus) of their melodies within the eight-mode system. Tonaries often include Office antiphons, the mode of which determines the recitation formula for the accompanying text (the psalm tone if the antiphon is sung with a psalm, or canticle tone if the antiphon is sung with a canticle), but a tonary may also or instead list responsories or Mass chants not associated with formulaic recitation. Although some tonaries are stand-alone works, they were frequently used as an appendix to other liturgical books such as antiphonaries, graduals, tropers, and prosers, and are often included in collections of musical treatises.

== Function and form ==
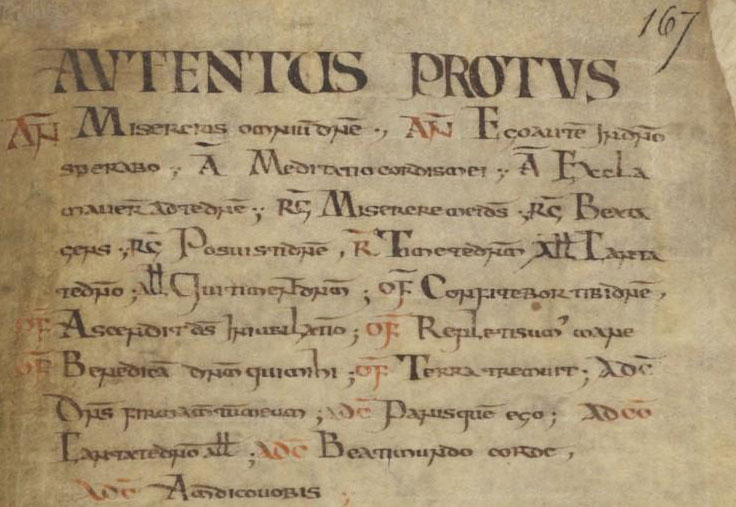
The earliest Tonary: the fragment of Saint-Riquier (F-Pn lat. 13159, fol. 167r)

Tonaries were particularly important as part of the written transmission of plainchant, although they already changed the oral chant transmission of Frankish cantors entirely before musical notation was used systematically in fully notated chant books. Since the Carolingian reform the ordering according to the Octoechos assisted the memorization of chant. The exact order was related to the elements of the "tetrachord of the finales" (D—E—F—G) which were called "Protus, Deuterus, Tritus", and "Tetrardus". Each of them served as the finalis of two toni—the "authentic" (ascending into the higher octave) and the "plagal" one (descending into the lower fourth). The eight tones were ordered in these pairs: "Autentus protus, Plagi Proti, Autentus Deuterus" etc. Since Hucbald of Saint-Amand the eight tones were simply numbered according to this order: Tonus I-VIII. Aquitanian cantors usually used both names for each section.

The earliest tonaries, written during the 8th century, were very short and simple without any visible reference to psalmody. Tonaries of the 9th century already ordered a huge repertoire of psalmodic chant into sections of psalmtone endings, even if their melody was not indicated or indicated by later added neumes. Most of the tonaries which have survived until now can be dated back to the 11th and 12th centuries, while some were written during later centuries, especially in Germany.

The treatise form usually served as a bridge between the Octoechos theory and the daily practice of prayer: memorizing and performing the liturgy as chant and reciting the psalms. This can be studied at a 10th-century treatise called Commemoratio brevis de tonis et psalmis modulandis, which used the Dasia-signs of the Musica enchiriadis treatise (9th century) in order to transcribe the melodic endings or terminations of psalmody. 11th-century theorists like Guido of Arezzo (Regulae rhythmicae) or Hermann of Reichenau (Musica) refused the Dasia tone system, because it displayed tetraphonic tone system and not the systema teleion (corresponding to the white keys of the keyboard) which had all the pitches needed for the "melos of the echoi" (ex sonorum copulatione in "Musica enchiriadis", emmelis sonorum in the compilation "alia musica"). Nevertheless, the first example of the eighth chapter in Musica enchiriadis, called "Quomodo ex quatuor Sonorum vi omnes toni producantur", already used the fifth of the Protus (D—a) for an illustration, how alleluia melodies are developed by the use of the intonation formula for the "Autentus protus".

=== The different forms of a tonary ===
Tonaries can differ substantially in length and shape:

- As a treatise they usually describe the octave, fifth and fourth species of each tone, but also their modal characteristics like microtonal shifts or the change to another melodic frame.
- It can also be an abridged form or breviary, which just show the sacramentary (for mass chants) or antiphonary (for the office chant of the Vigils and the Hours) according to the liturgical year. The tonus of the antiphonal chant genres is indicated by later added rubrics as "ATe" for "Autentus Tetrardus" (see the Gradual-Sacramentaries of Corbie and Saint-Denis) or the Roman Ordinals I-VIII according to Hucbald's system, as we can find it in the early Troper-Sequentiary of St. Géraud in Aurillac (F-Pn lat. 1084) and the abridged Antiphonary of St. Martial (F-Pn lat. 1085).
- The most common form was the shortest one which had no theoretical explanation. Since the late 9th century each section started with an intonation formula and the psalmody of the mode, its pitches represented by letters or later by diastematic neume notation. Subsections followed the different chant genres quoted as examples for the represented tone. Antiphonal refrains in psalm recitation (antiphons like introits and communiones), usually represented by its text incipit, were sorted according to various terminations used in psalmody, the so-called "differentiae".
- A very rare form of tonary is a fully notated one, which shows every chant genre (not only the antiphonal ones with psalmody as introit and communio of the proper mass) ordered according to its tonus. A very famous example is the full tonary for mass chant by Abbot William of Volpiano, written for his Abbey St. Benignus of Dijon (F-MOf H.159).

=== The tonary's function in chant transmission ===
During the Carolingian reform the tonary played a key role in the organization and the transfer of Roman chant, which had to be sung by Frankish cantors according to Charlemagne's admonitio generalis after it was decreed in 789. The historical background was the Second Council of Nicaea in 787, during which Pope Adrian I accepted the Eastern Octoechos reform also for the Roman church. Fully notated neume manuscripts like the gradual and the antiphonary were written much later, during the last decades of the 10th century, and the oral transmission of Gregorian chant is proved by additions of neumes in sacramentaries. In the tonary, the whole repertory of "Gregorian chant" was ordered according to its modal classification of the Octoechos.

Michel Huglo developed in his dissertation the hypothesis about an original tonary which preceded the Metz tonary and the tonary of St. Riquier. It was probably a coincidence that Pope Adrian I supported the Eastern Octoechos reform, but it is also evident that Carolingian diplomates present at the synode did not get interested in the communication of the modes by intonations called enechemata for the first time. Nevertheless, it was the difference between Greek and Latin chant sources, especially the particular function of the tonary in chant transmission, that led Peter Jeffery to the conclusion that the huge repertoire of Roman chant was classified according to the Octoechos a posteriori. While early manuscripts of Greek chant always used modal signatures (even before neume notation was used), the fully notated graduals and antiphonaries of the first generation (10th century), written by Frankish cantors, report many details about accentuation and ornamentation, but the melodic structure was remembered orally by tropes. Sometimes a tonary was attached to these manuscripts, and the cantors could use it by looking for the incipit of an antiphon in question (e.g. an introit or communio) to find the right psalmody according to the mode and the melodic ending of the antiphon, which was sung as a refrain during the recitation of the psalm. A Greek psaltes would sing a completely different melody according to the echos indicated by the modal signature, while Frankish cantors had to remember the melody of a certain Roman chant before they communicated their idea of its mode and its psalmody in a tonary—for all the cantors who would follow them. In this process of chant transmission, which followed Charlemagne's reform, the so-called "Gregorian chant" or Franco-Roman chant, as it was written down about 150 years after the reform, was born.

The function of the tonary within chant transmission explains why local schools of Latin chant can be studied by their tonary. Hence, the tonary was still substantial for every chant reform between the 10th and the 12th centuries, like the reform of the Cluniac Monastic Association (tonaries of Aquitania, Paris, and Fleury, but also in Northern Spain), the reform of a monastic orders like the one around Bernard of Clairvaux for the Cistercians (Tonale Sci Bernardi), a papal reform, like Abbot Desiderius realized at the Abbey Montecassino (Tonary of Montecassino), or the reform of some monasteries of a certain region, as Abbot William of Volpiano did for certain Abbeys in Burgundy and Normandy (William of Volpiano's Toner-Gradual and Antiphonary).

== The Carolingian names or "Byzantine" intonations for the 8 tones ==
In Carolingian times each of the eight sections was opened by an intonation formula using the names like "Nonannoeane" for the authentic and "Noeagis" or "Noeais" for the plagal tones. In the living traditions of Orthodox chant, these formulas were called "enechemata" and they were used by a protopsaltes to communicate the basis tone for the ison-singers (a kind of bordun) as well as the first note of the chant for the other singers.

In his theoretical tonary "Musica disciplina", Aurelian of Réôme asked a Greek about the meaning of the intonation syllables used in Latin tonaries:

Caeterum nomina, quae ipsis inscribuntur tonis, ut est in primo tono Nonaneane, et in secundo Noeane, et caetera quaeque, moveri solet animus, quid in se contineant significationis? Etenim quemdam interrogavi graecum, in latina quid interpretarentur lingua? respondit, se nihil interpretari, sed esse apud eos laetantis adverbia: quantoque maior est vocis concentus, eo plures inscribuntur syllabae: ut in authento proto, qui principium est, sex inseruntur syllabae, videlicet hae Noeane Nonannoeane; in authentu deuteri: in authentu triti, quoniam minoris sunt metri, quinque tantummodo eis inscribuntur syllabae, ut est Noioeane. In plagis autem eorum consimilis est litteratura, scilicet Noeane, sive secundum quosdam Noeacis. Memoratus denique adiunxit graecus, huiusmodi, inquiens, nostra in lingua videntur habere consimilitudinem, qualem arantes sive angarias minantes exprimere solent, excepto quod haec laetantis tantummodo sit vox, nihilque aliud exprimentis, estque tonorum in se continens modulationem.
My mind was usually moved by some of the names, which were inscribed for the tones, as "Nonan[no]eane" for the protus, and "Noeane" for the deuterus. Did they have any significance? So I asked a Greek, how these could be translated into Latin. He answered that they did not mean anything, but they were rather expressions of joy. And the greater the harmony of the voice, the more syllables were inscribed to the tone: as in the "authentus protus" which was the first, they used six syllables as "No[neno]eane" or "Nonannoeane"; for "authentus tritus", which was smaller in measure [not so much worth], five syllables as "Noioeane" were inscribed. In plagal tones the letters were similar to "Noeane", as "Noeacis" according to them. When I asked him, if there might be something similar in our language, the Greek added, that I should rather think of something expressed by charioteers or ploughing peasants, when their voice had nothing else than this joy. The same contained the modulation of the tones [during their intonation].

— Aurelianus Reomensis Musica disciplina (Gerbert 1784, p. 42)

The practice of using abstract syllables for the intonation, as it was common for the use of enechemata among Byzantine psaltes, was obviously not familiar to Aurelian of Réôme. It was probably imported by a Byzantine legacy, when they introduced the Greek Octoechos by a series of procession antiphons used for the feast of Epiphany. Although the Latin names were not identical, there is some resemblance between the intonation formula of the echos plagios tetartos νὲ ἅγιε and the Latin name "Noeagis", used as a general name for all four plagal tones. But there are some more obvious cases as particular names like "Aianeoeane" (enechema of the Mesos tetartos) or "Aannes" (enechema of the echos varys) which can be found in very few tonaries between Liège, Paris, Fleury, and Chartres. Two of these tonaries have treatises and use a lot of Greek terms taken from Ancient Greek theory.

== The later practice of the intonation verses ==
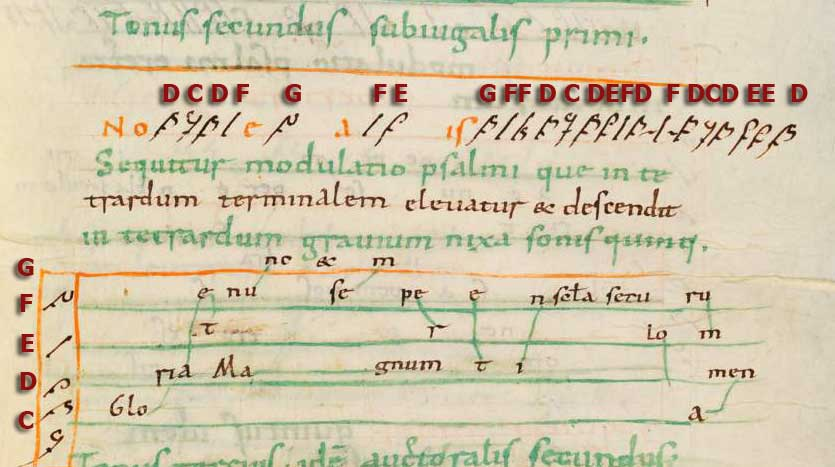
Tonary about 1000: Intonation and psalmody of "Plagi protus" notated in Dasia signs (D-BAs Ms. Msc.Var.1, fol. 44r)

The oldest tonaries, especially the Carolingian like those of St. Riquier, Metz, Reichenau and the earliest tonary in a troper of Limoges (F-Pn lat. 1240), only used the so-called "Byzantine" intonation formulas, as they were discussed by Aurelian of Réôme (Musica disciplina), Regino of Prüm (Tonarius), and Berno of Reichenau (Tonarium). But since the 10th century, also biblical verses were used. They were composed together in one antiphon with each verse changing the tone and referring to the number of the tonus according to the system of Hucbald (Tonus primus, secundus, terius etc.), similar to Guido of Arezzo's use of the solmization hymn "Ut queant laxis". They were several different antiphons as they can be found in the Hartker-Antiphonary or the treatise collection of Montecassino (Ms. Q318, p. 122–125), but no one became so popular than a compilation of verses taken from the New Testament which started with "Primum querite regnum dei". Usually each verse is finished by a long melisma or neuma which clearly show its potential to become a tool of improvisation and composition as well. The origin of these verses is unknown. In some tonaries, they replaced the Carolingian intonations as in the tonary by Berno of Reichenau, but more often they were written under them or alternated with them in the subsections like in a certain group which Michel Huglo (1971) called the "Toulouse tonaries" (F-Pn lat. 776, 1118, GB-Lbl Ms. Harley 4951), but also in the tonary of Montecassino. Concerning the earliest fully notated chant manuscripts, it seems that the practice of singing the intonation formulas was soon replaced by another practice, that a soloist intoned the beginning of an antiphon, responsorium, or alleluia, and after this "incipit" of the soloist the choir continued. These changes between precentor and choir were usually indicated by an asterisk or by the use of maiuscula at the beginning the chant text. The psalmody could be indicated by an incipit of the required psalm and the differentia notated over the syllables EVOVAE after the communio or introit antiphon.

== Cross-references between tonaries during the reforms between the 10th and the 13th centuries ==
Nevertheless, the tonary was not replaced by these manuscripts. While the first generation of notated manuscripts became less and less readable until the end of the 10th century, the production of tonaries as useful appendix highly increased, especially in Aquitania, the Loire valley (Île-de-France) and Burgundy. Probably the oral tradition of the melody was no longer properly working since the early 11th century, or there was still a need in a lot of regions to teach certain cantors an unknown tradition, or the tradition itself had to change under certain innovations of cantors who were in charge of an institutional reform. Studies of the reforms of various regions in Spain, Germany, Italy, and France have found evidence for all these cases whatever was the centre of each reform which had taken place between the late 10th and the 12th centuries. The monk Hartvic added some Dasia signs for certain differentiae as a kind of rubric or comment on the margin (Tonary of St. Emmeram, Regensburg). He knew them from the treatises Musica and Scholica enchiriadis which he copied in this manuscript, and thus he discovered a new way of using them: as an additional explanation or second pitch notation interpreting the adiastematic neumes.

=== The Cluniac reforms and the counter-reforms ===
During the late 10th and the 11th century, the early use of a second alphabetical pitch notation was soon replaced by a new diastematic form of neume notation, which indicated the pitch by the vertical position of the neumes, while their groups indicated by ligatures were still visible. Aquitanian and English cantors in Winchester were the first who developed a diastematic form, which could be written in such an analytical way.

==== William of Volpiano and the Norman line ====
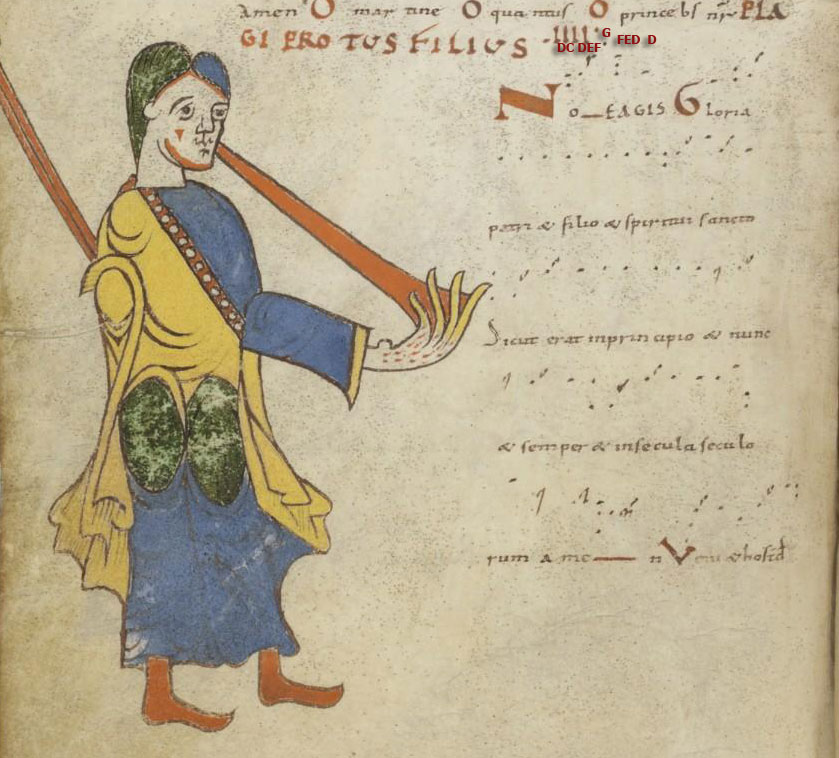
"Plagi Protus" intonation in the Tonary of the Auch region (Aquitaine, 11th cent.): F-Pn lat. 1118, fol. 105v

William of Volpiano elaborated the concept of an additional letter notation and created a new form of tonary which became an important part of his monastic reforms, he did the first reform for Cluny, after he became abbot of St. Benignus of Dijon in Burgundy. Since 1001 he changed to the Abbey of Fécamp, after he was asked by the Norman Duke Richard II to guide secular and monastic reforms in the Duchy of Normandy.

The fully notated tonary which he wrote for St. Benignus (F-MOf H159), is following the order of other tonaries, which were created under the influence of the Cluniac Monastic Association. These tonaries usually had sections dedicated to the antiphonary and the gradual, within the gradual and the antiphonary there were subsections like the antiphons which were sung as refrains during psalm recitation (introits and communions), responsories (the conclusion of epistle readings), but also other genres of the proper mass chant such as alleluia verses (the introduction of gospels), offertories (a soloistic processional antiphon for the procession of the gifts).

Several Aquitanian troper-sequentiaries had a libellum structure which sorted the genres in separate books like alleluia verses (as the first part of sequentiaries and tractus collections), offertorials, and tropers. But William of Volpiano subdivided these books into eight parts according to the octoechos system like the tonary, or the troparia in the Byzantine book Octoechos, and within these sections the chant was ordered according to the cycle of the liturgical year starting with advent. He used the neumes of Cluny, the central French forms, without changing them, but he added an own system of alphabetic notation in a second row, which defined the pitches of the melody precisely according to the Boethian diagramm. Like any other chant manuscript around 1000, the book was not written for a use during a ceremony, it was a "book of memory" for cantors who alone had the competence of reading and writing neumes, and the responsibility to organize the chant sung during the liturgical year. During his reforms, several Abbeys followed his example and his system was used by the teachers of the local grammar schools which included the daily practice of singing the liturgy.

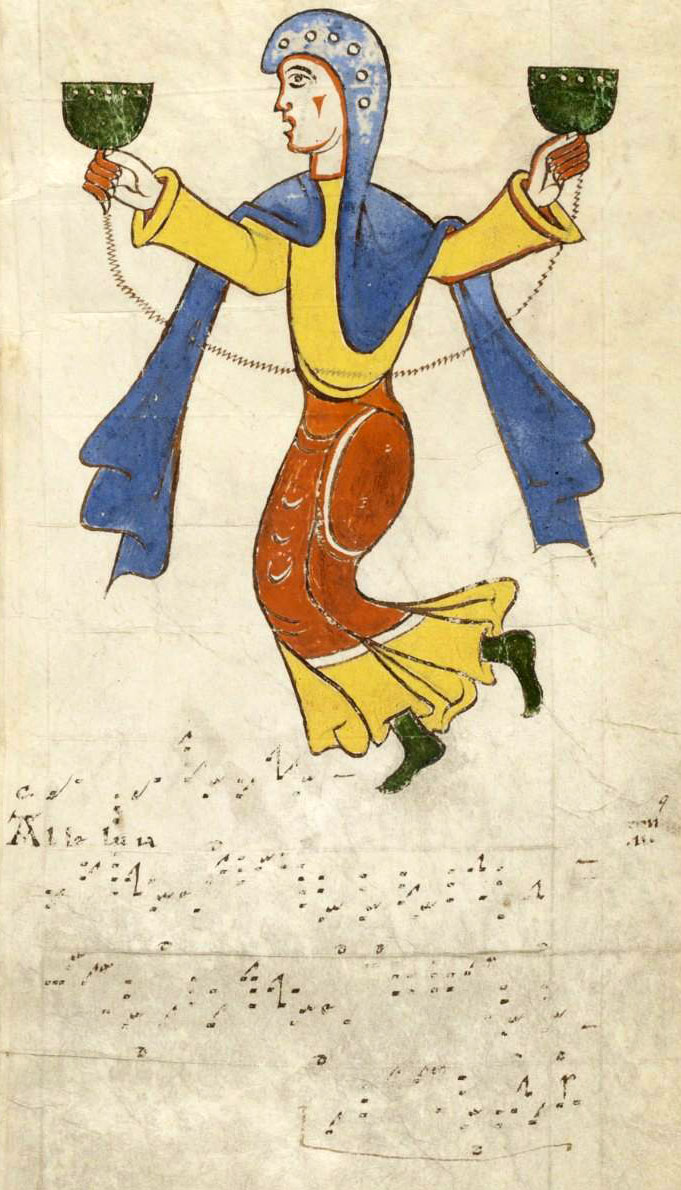
Sequentiary from Aquitaine, end 10th century (F-Pn lat. 1118, fol. 114r)

William's reform and its monastic foundations of Fécamp and the construction of the Abbey on the island of Mont Saint-Michel were not the first, and there were a lot of later abbots who founded monasteries not only in Normandy, but also in the conquered territories of Northern, and Southern Italy, including Arabian Sicily, after the Norman Kingdom was established in the conquered Island. His fully notated tonaries were only copied in Brittany and Normandy, the Norman-Sicilian manuscripts rather imitated the libellum structure of the Aquitanian troper-sequentiaries, and only a few of them (E-Mn 288, F-Pn lat. 10508) have survived with a tonary using central French neume notation, in its style very close to the chant books of Cluny. The «Bibliothèque interuniversitaire de Médecin» still conserves the only manuscript with alphabetic notation which can be dated back to William's time. Thanks to the creative and innovative achievements of William as a cantor, reformer and architect, the local monasteries which he reformed, did not simply adapt to customs of the Cluniac reform, he contributed to the history of Norman chant his own local school which was as well inspired by elements of the local Norman tradition as by innovations of the Cluniac reform.

==== The Aquitanian tonaries and the Winchester Troper ====
The Aquitanian innovation due to an analytical diastematic notation can be traced back to a 10th-century development which culminated with a systematic redaction of local manuscripts by a family of prominent cantors: Adémar de Chabannes was educated by his uncle Roger de Chabannes at the Saint-Martial Abbey of Limoges and this school redacted the first chant manuscripts by additional modal signatures and a remarkable production of tonaries, which Michel Huglo called the "Saint-Martial group" or the monastic tonaries of Aquitaine. Adémar was the next generation after William of Volpiano and he was the final touch in a long row of notators who used the diastematic form of Aquitanian neume notation which was well developed during the late 10th century. But the Abbey of Cluny showed little interest in the local repertoire of the Limoges tropers, a local contribution which had been ignored during their reforms, although the richly illustrated Aquitanian tonaries (especially the "Toulouse group") had obviously inspired the column sculptures dedicated to the eight church tones at the apsis of Cluny III whose monumental construction began in 1088.

Another tonary corpus of the same region was Huglo's "Toulouse groupe" around the Gradual of the Saint-Étienne cathedral in Toulouse (GB-Lbl Ms. Harley 4951, F-Pn lat. 1118, and 776). All of these books of the local secular cathedral rite have a tonary libellum. The oldest one is the Troper Sequentiary of the Auch region (F-Pn lat. 1118) which was probably written in Limoges during the 10th century. The intonation of the "plagi protus" (on folio 105 verso) is rather exposing the melos used in Old Roman chant of this tone (ranging between C and G), but the sequentiary (folio 114 recto) is opened by an "improvised" alleluia of the same tone simply made by a similar intonation which is also using the plagal fourth A-D under the final note D according to the Carolingian concept of the plagal mode. On folio 131 verso there is another alleluia made of the same intonation, but here the same intonation is rather artificially cut into segments for the words of the sequence «Almifona». Here, the improvised melodic structure developed by a repetitive use of the intonation formula had turned into a sophisticated composition which dealt with the syllables of poetry.

A central line, usually on F or G, was added and helped to recognize their horizontal organization, during the 12th century a second line was added until they were replaced by a pentagram in square notation by the second half of the 12th century.

Thanks to Aquitanian cantors the network of the Cluniac Monastic Association was not only a problematic accumulation of political power during the crusades among aristocratic churchmen, which caused rebellions in several Benedictine monasteries and the foundation of new anti-Cluniac reform orders, they also cultivated new forms of chant performance which dealt with poetry, and polyphony like discantus and organum. They were used in all possible combinations which turned improvisation into composition, and composition into improvisation. The imitation of these forms in Spain, and Italy were caused by papal reforms which tried to organize the church provinces in newly conquered territories or territories which conserved older rites, because reforms could hardly be established for a long time.

The diastematic notation of Aquitanian cantors and their most innovative use in tropes and punctum contra punctum polyphony which can be also found in the Chartres Cathedral, the Abbey Saint-Maur-des-Fossés near Paris, and Fleury Abbey, also influenced the Winchester troper (see its tonary), the earliest and hugest collection of early organum or discantus. Since 1100, the florid organum reproduced the original function of the earlier intonation formula as it can be found in the tonaries. An initial ornament called principium ante principium ("beginning before the beginning") in the Notre Dame school allowed the solistic organum singer to indicate the basis degree of the cantus by an individual intonation in the higher octave, while the finale octave of each section was prepared by an paenultima ornament, which had developed by the "meeting" (occursus) of chant and organum voice.

==== Tonaries of the reform orders ====
During this long period Cluny's power and influence on less and less successful crusades which were well reflected in certain chant genres like conductus and motet, caused a decline and an increasing resistance among the monastic communities of the Cluniac Association between Paris, Burgundy, Île-de-France, and Aquitaine. New monastic orders were founded in order to establish anti-Cluniac counter-reforms. The most important was certainly created among Cistercians by a reform group around St. Bernard of Clairvaux. The innovations and corrections of Roman-Frankish chant during the Cluniac reforms were disregarded as a corruption of the Roman tradition, but the new books ordered from the scriptoria of Laon and Metz did not satisfy the expectations of the reformers. Instead rules based on Guido of Arezzo's Micrologus were codified to support the Cistercian cantors, while they were cleaning the corrupted tradition of plainchant. Despite certain ambitions concerning the performance practice of polyphonic organum, the first generation of reformers around Bernard did not allow these Cluniac practices. Nevertheless, they were established soon, as Bernard became one of the most important and powerful churchmen involved in crusade policies which clearly corresponded to the refused aristocratic ambitions within the Cluniac Association. During Bernard's liturgical reform the tonary still served as an important tool and its modal patterns formed the basis of the corrections made by Cistercian cantors.

=== The tonaries in Italy ===
The local liturgical traditions in large parts of Italy remained stable, because there was simply no written transmission which could interfere with any reform until the end of the 10th century. A lot of local neumes used by Beneventan and Old Roman notators already started in a diastematic form, and the local scribes used the same opportunity to codify their own tradition, and in a second step of a reform which could not earlier be realized until a political conquest allowed the domination of a certain region, they had to deal with a codified chant repertory which was supposed to be "Roman". The transfer was done by written transmission, and this explains certain cross-references which can be studied in detail by the notated chant repertory, but more easily by the copies and the local neumes used in tonaries.

From this point of view, several tonaries, already transmitted by earlier French sources, can be found in later copies in Italian manuscripts, often written in French scriptoria and their neume notation. Nevertheless, a lot of Italian cantors were authors of tonaries which played a key role during Carolingian, Cluniac, and anti-Cluniac reforms in France and Lake Constance. As example, William of Volpiano from Piedmont, Guido of Arezzo, whose treatises were used during the Cistercian and Beneventan reform, while there is no source which testifies the use of tonaries among Roman cantors. The famous Dialogus, falsely ascribed to Odo of Cluny, the second Abbot of Cluny Abbey, was compiled in the province of Milan, while only "Formulas quas vobis", a tonary used in Montecassino and Southern Italy, was written by another Odo, Abbot of Arezzo.

Older traditions like Old-Roman, Ambrosian, as well as Old-Beneventan manuscripts follow own modal patterns which are not identical with those of "Gregorian chant", i.e. the Roman-Frankish redaction between the first generation of fully notated manuscripts (since the 1050s), the Cluniac reforms (11th century), and the "Neo-Gregorian reforms" of the late 11th and 12th centuries in centres like Montecassino and Benevento, or in reform orders like Cistercians or Dominicans etc. The Norman-Sicilian tonary shows a great resemblance with manuscripts written in Cluny.

== See also ==
- Hagiopolitan Octoechos
- Solfège
- Micrologus

== Bibliography ==
=== Sources ===
==== Carolingian tonaries and gradual-sacramentaries (8th–9th century) ====
- "Paris, Bibliothèque Nationale de France, fonds. lat., Ms. 13159, fol. 167-167'". Tonaryfragment of St. Riquier in the "Psalter of Charlemagne" (ed. by Huglo 1952, 225–227; 1971, 26–28).
- "Paris, Bibliothèque Nationale de France, fonds. lat., Ms. 17436, fol. 29". Gradual-Sacramentary, Sequentiary, and Antiphonary of the Abbey Saint-Corneille de Compiègne (ca. 860–880).
- Rodrade. "Paris, Bibliothèque Nationale, fonds lat., Ms. 12050, fol. 3–16". Gradual-Sacramentary ordered by the Bishop of Amiens for Corbie (about 853).
- "Laon, Bibliothèque municipale, Ms. 118, fol. A.1'-A.12'". Gradual-Sacramentary and Lectionary of the Abbey Saint-Denis (late 9th century).
- Aurelian of Réôme. "Valenciennes, Bibliothèque municipale, Ms. 148, fol. 71v-86v". 3 tonaries "Quae ipsis inscribantur tonis" with some intonations in later added Paleofrankish neumes within "Musica disciplina" (ch. IX-XIX), Saint-Amand Abbey (ca. 880–885). Gallica.

==== Lorrain cantors ====
- "Metz, Médiathèque, Ms. 351, fol. 66–76". Tonary of Metz (copied 878). 14 May 2008.
- "Prague, Národní knihovna (dríve Universitní knihovna), Ms. 273, fol. 1–11". Tonary in red ink ("Primus igitur lydius...") of the "Ratio breviter super musicum cum tonario [fol. 4r]" (Tonary of Leyden) with Lorrain neumes and Greek terminology (close to the "alia musica" compilation) in a treatise collection near Liège (ca. 1100).

==== Alemannic cantors ====
- "Einsiedeln, Stiftsbibliothek, Ms. 121, p. 417-427". Psalmody of the Communiones in the Gradual and Notker's Sequentiary from the Einsiedeln Monastery (960–970).
- Hartker. "St. Gallen, Stiftsbibliothek, Cod. Sang. 390, p. 1-5". Antiphonary of the Abbey St. Gall (late 10th century).
- Hartker. "St. Gallen, Stiftsbibliothek, Cod. Sang. 391, p. 1–8, 261–264". Antiphonary of the Abbey St. Gall (late 10th century).
- Hoger of Werden. "Staatsbibliothek Bamberg, Msc.Var.1, fol. 42'-46'". Fragment of Commemoratio brevis de tonis et psalmis modulandis in a music theory treatise collection from Werden? (about 1000).
- Arator Diaconus. "Dresden, Sächsische Landesbibliothek, Ms. A 199, fol. 37". Tonary fragment on two pages with St Gall neumes inserted at the end of a Hexameter version of Apostolic Acts by Arator Diaconus, Augsburg? (about 1000).
- "Staatsbibliothek Bamberg, Msc.Lit.5, fol. 5–27". Tonary of Reichenau (copied 1001 in Reichenau).
- "Staatsbibliothek Bamberg, Msc.Lit.5, fol. 187–196". Notker Balbulus, Theodulfus Aurelianensis: 2nd Tonary in the Troper and Sequentiary from Reichenau (1001).
- Hartvic (copyist). "Munich, Bayerische Staatsbibliothek, Ms. Clm 14272, fol. 62'-64'". Tonary with Dasia signs from the Abbey St. Emmeram, Regensburg (1006–1028).
- Hartvic (copyist). "Munich, Bayerische Staatsbibliothek, Ms. Clm 14272, fol. 173'-174". Fragment of Commemoratio brevis de tonis et psalmis modulandis with Dasia signs from the Abbey St. Emmeram, Regensburg (1006–1028).
- Hartvic (copyist). "Munich, Bayerische Staatsbibliothek, Ms. Clm 14272, fol. 175–181". Theoretical tonary compilation alia musica (manuscript M) with neumed intonations, psalmody, and additional tonary rubrics from the Abbey St. Emmeram, Regensburg (1006–1028).
- Berno of Reichenau. "St. Gallen, Stiftsbibliothek, Cod. Sang. 898, p. 2–25". "De consona tonorum diversitate" with tonary, in "Bernonis Epistolae cum sermonibus et hymnis", St. Gall Abbey, copy of a dedicated collection for King Henry III (11th century).
- Berno of Reichenau. "Rome, Biblioteca Apostolica Vaticana, Pal. lat. 1344, fol. 19–33'". "Musica seu Prologus in Tonarium" with tonary after the prologue, Greek names according to Hucbald are used for the finales, Saint Gall neumes have been added to the intonation formulas, Monastery Lorsch (mid 11th century).
- "Wolfenbüttel, Herzog-August Bibliothek, Cod. Guelf. 1050 Helmstedt (cat. 1152), fol. 16'-27'". List of enechemata and tonary with St. Gall neumes in a music theory collection (13th century).
- "Leipzig, Universitätsbibliothek, Ms. Thomas 391, fol. 3'-5". Tonary with square notation in a collection of music treatises from the Augustine convent Saint Thomas of Leipzig (14th century).

==== Aquitanian cantors ====
- "Paris, Bibliothèque Nationale, fonds lat., Ms. 1240, fol. 62'-64'". Troper from the church St. Salvator Mundi, St. Martial Abbey in Limoges (933–936).
- "Paris, Bibliothèque Nationale, fonds lat., Ms. 1084, fol. 155–164'". Troper, Tonary, Sequentiary and Proser from St. Géraud, Aurillac (late 10th century).
- "Paris, Bibliothèque Nationale, fonds lat., Ms. 1085, fol. 3'-110'". Abridged Antiphonary from the church St. Salvator Mundi, St. Martial Abbey in Limoges, with later modal classifications by Roger & Adémar de Chabannes (late 10th century).
- "Paris, Bibliothèque Nationale, fonds lat., Ms. 1118, fol. 104–113'". Troper, Tonary, Sequentiary and Proser from Southwestern France, Région d'Auch (990–1010).
- "Paris, Bibliothèque Nationale, fonds lat., Ms. 1121, fol. 202–206'". Troper, Sequentiary, and Tonary of St. Martial de Limoges, Adémar de Chabannes (11th century).
- "Paris, Bibliothèque Nationale, fonds lat., Ms. 909, fol. 251–257'". Troper, Sequentiary, and Tonary of St. Martial de Limoges (11th century).
- "Paris, Bibliothèque Nationale, fonds lat., Ms. 776, fol. 147–154'". Tonary fragment at the end of the Gradual of Saint-Michel-de-Gaillac (Albi, about 1079).
- "London, British Library, Harley 4951, fol. 295'–301'". Gradual of Saint-Etienne of Toulouse, including a tonary (late 11th century).
- "Paris, Bibliothèque Nationale, fonds lat., Ms. 780, fol. 123'-130". Gradual and Tonary from the Cathedral of SS Just et Pastor, Narbonne (late 11th century).

==== Parisian and Cluniac cantors ====
- "Paris, Bibliothèque Nationale, fonds lat., Ms. 12584, fol. 216". Tonary (12th century) of the Gradual and Antiphonary of the Abbey Saint-Maur-des-Fossés (11th century).
- "Paris, Bibliothèque Nationale, fonds lat., Ms. 13252, fol. 71–76'". Tonary in a Troper for the Abbey St.-Germain-des-Prés, Paris (11th century).
- "Paris, Bibliothèque Nationale, fonds lat., Ms. 8663, fol. 50'-51". Tonary compilation "Alia musica" in a treatise collection from Fleury Abbey (11th century).
- "Paris, Bibliothèque Nationale, fonds lat., Ms. 7211, fol. 54–71". Tonary compilation "Alia musica" in a treatise collection from St-Pierre de Luxeuil (12th century).
- "Paris, Bibliothèque Nationale, fonds lat., Ms. 17296, fol. 11'". Antiphonary of Saint-Denis Abbey with rubrified differentiae (about 1140–50).
- "Paris, Bibliothèque Nationale, Ms. Nouv. Acq. Lat. 443, fol. 29–33". Tonary fragment in a manuscript from Fleury Abbey (about 1200).
- "Bamberg, Staatsbibliothek, Msc.Lit.115, fol. 68'-74". Tonary of Amerus' treatise "Practica artis musice" in the motet collection Bamberg, Paris (1275–1285).

==== Cistercian cantors ====
- Berno of Reichenau. "Leipzig, Universitätsbibliothek, Ms. 1493, fol. 53–60". Elaborated theoretic tonary with neumes of St Gall by Berno of Reichenau in a collection of the Abbey Saint Peter at Merseburg transferred to the Cistercian Abbey of Altzelle (ca. 1075).
- "Paris, Bibliothèque Nationale, nouv. acq. lat., Ms. 1410, fol. 159'-166'". Antiphonary of the Abbey St. Mary of Morimondo in the Diocese of Milan (12th century).
- "Vienna, Österreichische Nationalbibliothek, Cod. 1799**, fol. 216r-222v (Digit. No. 454-467)". Tonary of the Cistercian Antiphoner, Rein (1225–1249). Austrian National Library.

==== Dominican cantors ====
- "Paris, Bibliothèque Nationale, fonds lat., Ms. 16663, fol. 54'-57". Tonary with letter notation in the Music Treatise of Jerome of Moravia (late 13th century).
- "State Library of Victoria, RARESF 096.1, Ms. R66A, fol. 1'-4". Tonary with square neumes in the Poissy Antiphonal, Monastery of Saint-Louis de Poissy (1335–1345).

==== Italian cantors ====
- "Paris, Bibliothèque Nationale, fonds lat., Ms. 7202, fol. 52'". Tonary with Dasia notation in Inchiriadon in a French treatise collection for the Dominican Collegio Colbert, Venice (11th century).
- "Rome, Biblioteca Casanatense, Ms. 54, fol. 102'-103". Reichenau Tonary (copy in an 11th-century manuscript from Nonantola).
- Odo of Arezzo, "Montecassino, Biblioteca Abbaziale, Ms. 318, pp. 126–127", "Formulas super ad nos" in a Collection of Music Theory Treatises, Abbey St. Benedict of Montecassino (late 11th century)
- "Montecassino, Biblioteca Abbaziale, Ms. 318, pp. 122–123", "De octo tonora per ordinem" in a Collection of Music Theory Treatises, Abbey St. Benedict of Montecassino (late 11th century)
- "Montecassino, Biblioteca Abbaziale, Ms. 318, pp. 127–157", Tonary in Beneventan neumes in a Collection of Music Theory Treatises, Abbey St. Benedict of Montecassino (late 11th century)

==== Anglo-Saxon cantors ====
- "Cambridge, Corpus Christi College, Parker Library, Ms. 260, fol. 51'-53'". Fragment of Commemoratio brevis de tonis et psalmis modulandis in a treatise collection from Christ Church, Canterbury (late 10th century).
- "Cambridge, Corpus Christi College, Parker Library, Ms. 473, fol. 70–73'". Tonary of the Winchester Troper (11th century).

==== Norman cantors ====
- William of Volpiano. "Montpellier, Bibliothèque Interuniversitaire de Médecine, Ms. H159". Toner-Gradual & Antiphonary of the Abbey St. Bénigne in Dijon (late 10th century).
- "Madrid, Biblioteca nacional, Ms. 288, fol. 4–12". Tonary in a Norman-Sicilian Troper-Sequentiary (about 1100).
- "Paris, Bibliothèque nationale, fonds latin, ms. 10508, fol. 150'-156'". Tonary in a Guidonian treatise collection of Norman-Italian origin attached to the Troper-Proser of the Abbey St. Évroult (12th century).

=== Editions of tonaries ===
- Anonymous (1784), "Musica enchiriadis", in Gerbert, Martin (ed.), Scriptores ecclesiastici de musica sacra potissimum, vol. 1 (Hildesheim 1963 reprint ed.), St Blaise: Typis San-Blasianis, pp. 152–173.
- Aurelianus Reomensis (1784), "Musica disciplina", in Gerbert, Martin (ed.), Scriptores ecclesiastici de musica sacra potissimum, vol. 1 (Hildesheim 1963 reprint ed.), St Blaise: Typis San-Blasianis, pp. 27–63.
- Regino Prumiensis (1864–76), "Tonarius", in Coussemaker, Edmond de (ed.), Scriptorum de musica medii aevi nova series a Gerbertina altera, vol. 2 (Hildesheim 1963 reprint ed.), Paris: Durand, pp. 1–73.
- Gerbert, Martin, ed. (1784), "Commemoratio brevis de tonis et psalmis modulandis", Scriptores ecclesiastici de musica sacra potissimum, vol. 1 (Hildesheim 1963 reprint ed.), St Blaise: Typis San-Blasianis, pp. 213–229.
- Schmid, Hans, ed. (1981), "Inchiriadon", Musica et scolica enchiriadis una cum aliquibus tractatulis adiunctis, vol. 3, Munich: C. H. Beck, pp. 187–205.
- Berno Augiensis (1784), "Tonarius", in Gerbert, Martin (ed.), Scriptores ecclesiastici de musica sacra potissimum, vol. 2 (Hildesheim 1963 reprint ed.), St Blaise: Typis San-Blasianis, pp. 79–91.
- Berno Augiensis (1784), "De consona tonorum diversitate", in Gerbert, Martin (ed.), Scriptores ecclesiastici de musica sacra potissimum, vol. 2 (Hildesheim 1963 reprint ed.), St Blaise: Typis San-Blasianis, pp. 114–124.
- Odo of Arezzo (1784), "Tonarium", in Gerbert, Martin (ed.), Scriptores ecclesiastici de musica sacra potissimum, vol. 1 (Hildesheim 1963 reprint ed.), St Blaise: Typis San-Blasianis, pp. 247–250.
- Gerbert, Martin, ed. (1784), "Alia musica", Scriptores ecclesiastici de musica sacra potissimum, vol. 1 (Hildesheim 1963 reprint ed.), St Blaise: Typis San-Blasianis, pp. 125–152.
- Chailley, Jacques, ed. (1965), Alia musica (Traité de musique du IXe siècle): Édition critique commentée avec une introduction sur l'origine de la nomenclature modale pseudo-grecque au Moyen-Âge, Paris: Centre de documentation universitaire et Société d'édition d'enseignement supérieur réunis.
- Abbot Guido (1864–76), "Regulae de arte musica", in Coussemaker, Edmond de (ed.), Scriptorum de musica medii aevi nova series a Gerbertina altera, vol. 2 (Hildesheim 1963 reprint ed.), Paris: Durand, pp. 150–192.
- Abbot Guido (1989). Sweeney, Cecily (ed.). "The Regulae organi Guidonis Abbatis and 12th Century Organum/Discant Treatises". Musica Disciplina. 43: 27–30.
- Meyer, Christian, ed. (2009). Le traité dit de Saint-Martial revisité et réédité.
- Meyer, Christian (2003). Meyer, Christian (ed.). "Discipulus: Quid est tonus? — Tonale Cisterziense". Revue de Musicologie. 89 (1): 77–91. JSTOR 4494836.

=== Studies ===
- Atkinson, Charles M. (2008). The critical nexus: Tone-System, Mode, and Notation in Early Medieval Music. Oxford, New York [etc.]: Oxford University Press. ISBN 978-0-19-514888-6.
- Busse Berger, Anna Maria (2005), Medieval Music and the Art of Memory, Berkeley, Los Angeles: University of California Press, ISBN 978-0-19-514888-6.
- Chailley, Jacques (1985). "Les huit tons de la musique et l'éthos des modes aux chapiteaux de Cluny". Acta Musicologica. 57 (1): 73–95. doi:10.2307/932690. ISSN 0001-6241. JSTOR 932690.
- Diard, Olivier (2000). Les offices propres dans le sanctoral normand, étude liturgique et musicale (Xe-XVe siècles) (Thesis). Paris: PhD, Université de Paris IV-Sorbonne.
- Ferreira, Manuel Pedro (2007). Bailey, Terence; Dobszay, László (eds.). "Cluny at Fynystere: One Use, Three Fragments". Studies in Medieval Chant and Liturgy in Honour of David Hiley: 179–228.
- Gerlach, Oliver (2011). "Mikrotöne im Oktōīchos – oder über die Vermittlung mittelalterlicher Musiktheorie und Musik". Studies of the Dark Continent in European Music History – Collected Essays on Traditions of Religious Chant in the Balkans. Rome: Aracne. pp. 7–24. ISBN 978-88-548-3840-6.
- Gerlach, Oliver (2012). "About the Import of the Byzantine Intonation Aianeoeane in an 11th Century Tonary". In Altripp, Michael (ed.). Byzanz in Europa. Europas östliches Erbe: Akten des Kolloquiums 'Byzanz in Europa' vom 11. bis 15. Dezember 2007 in Greifswald. Turnhout: Brepols. pp. 172–183. ISBN 978-2-503-54153-2.
- Gillingham, Bryan (2006). Music in the Cluniac Ecclesia: A Pilot Project. Ottawa: Institute of Mediaeval Music. ISBN 978-1-896926-73-5.
- Grier, James (2006). The musical world of a medieval monk: Adémar de Chabannes in eleventh-century Aquitaine. Cambridge, New York, Melbourne, Madrid, Cape Town, Singapore, São Paulo: Cambridge University Press. ISBN 978-0-521-85628-7.
- Huglo, Michel (2001). "Tonary". New Grove Music Online. Oxford Music Online. doi:10.1093/gmo/9781561592630.article.28104. ISBN 978-1-56159-263-0.
- Huglo, Michel (1952). "Un tonaire du graduel de la fin du VIIIe siècle". Revue Grégorienne. 31: 176–186, 224–233.
- Huglo, Michel (1956). "Le tonaire de Saint-Bénigne de Dijon". Annales Musicologiques. 4: 7–18.
- Huglo, Michel (1971), Les Tonaires: Inventaire, Analyse, Comparaison, Publications de la Société française de musicologie, vol. 2, Paris: Société française de musicologie.
- Huglo, Michel (2000), "Grundlagen und Ansätze der mittelalterlichen Musiktheorie", in Ertelt, Thomas; Zaminer, Frieder (eds.), Die Lehre vom einstimmigen liturgischen Gesang, Geschichte der Musiktheorie, vol. 4, Darmstadt: Wissenschaftliche Buchgesellschaft, pp. 17–102, ISBN 978-3-534-01204-6.
- Jeffery, Peter (2001), "The Earliest Oktōēchoi: The Role of Jerusalem and Palestine in the Beginnings of Modal Ordering", The Study of Medieval Chant: Paths and Bridges, East and West; In Honor of Kenneth Levy, Woodbridge, Suffolk: Boydell Press, pp. 147–209, ISBN 978-0-85115-800-6.
- Maloy, Rebecca (2009). "Scolica Enchiriadis and the 'non-Diatonic' Plainsong Tradition". Early Music History. 28: 61–96. doi:10.1017/S0261127909000369. S2CID 192197222.
- Meyer, Christian (2003). "Le tonaire cistercien et sa tradition". Revue de Musicologie. 89 (1): 57–92. JSTOR 4494836.
- Nardini, Luisa (2003), "Montecassino, Archivio della Badia, ms. 318: Observations on the Second Tonary Mass Repertory", in Antolini, Bianca Maria; Gialdroni, Teresa Maria; Pugliese, Annunziato (eds.), "Et facciam dolçi canti" : Studi in onore di Agostino Ziino in occasione del suo 65. compleanno, vol. 1, Lucca: LIM, pp. 47–61, ISBN 978-88-7096-321-2.
- Nishimagi, Shin (2008). "Origine d'un 'libellus' guidonien provenant de l'abbaye de Saint-Evroult: Paris, BnF, lat. 10508, f. 136–159 (fin du XIIe siècle)" (PDF). Bulletin of the Institute for Mediterranean Studies (Waseda University). 6: 185–199.
- Phillips, Nancy (2000), "Notationen und Notationslehren von Boethius bis zum 12. Jahrhundert", in Ertelt, Thomas; Zaminer, Frieder (eds.), Die Lehre vom einstimmigen liturgischen Gesang, Geschichte der Musiktheorie, vol. 4, Darmstadt: Wissenschaftliche Buchgesellschaft, pp. 293–324, ISBN 978-3-534-01204-6.
- Raasted, Jørgen (1988). "Die Jubili Finales und die Verwendung von interkalierten Vokalisen in der Gesangspraxis der Byzantiner". In Brandl, Rudolf Maria (ed.). Griechische Musik und Europa: Antike, Byzanz, Volksmusik der Neuzeit; Symposion "Die Beziehung der griechischen Musik zur Europäischen Musiktradition" vom 9. – 11. Mai 1986 in Würzburg. Orbis musicarum. Aachen: Ed. Herodot. pp. 67–80. ISBN 978-3-924007-77-5.
- Strunk, William Oliver (1960). "The Latin Antiphons of the Oktoechos". Journal of the American Musicological Society. 13: 50–67. doi:10.2307/830246. JSTOR 830246.
- Sweeney, Cecily Pauline (1992). "Unlocking the Mystery of the Regulae de arte musica". Musica Disciplina. 46: 243–267. JSTOR 20532365.
