= Samson (name) =

Samson can be either a masculine given name or a surname. It may refer to the following people:

== Given name ==
- Samson Dadiani (1886-1937), Georgian politician
- Samson of Dol (c. 485–c. 565), British saint
- Samson of Brechin (fl. 1150–1165), first known Bishop of Brechin, Scotland
- Samson of Tottington (1135–1211), English Benedictine monk and Abbot of Bury St. Edmunds
- Samson (bishop of Worcester) (died 1112), chaplain to William the Conqueror, later Bishop of Worcester
- Samson Abramsky (born 1953), British computer scientist
- Samson Adetayo Adeleke, Nigerian actor
- Samson Felix Amarasinghe, Sri Lankan Sinhala civil servant
- Samson Ebukam (born 1995), American football player
- Samson Gombe (1938–1989), Kenyan scientist and professor
- Samson Johnson (born 2002), Togolese basketball player
- Samson Kandie (born 1971), Kenyan long-distance runner
- Samson Kitur (1966–2003), Kenyan middle-distance runner
- Samson Lee (born 1992), Welsh rugby union player
- Samson Makintsev (1776–1849), Russian-Iranian general
- Samson Mulugeta (born 1983), Ethiopian footballer
- Samson Mwita Marwa (1932–2022), Kenyan member of parliament
- Samson Nacua (born 1998), American football player
- Samson Okunlola (born 2004), American football player
- Samson Rausuk (1793–1877), Lithuanian-British librarian and poet
- Samson Tam (born 1964), Hong Kong politician

== Surname ==
- Charles Rumney Samson (1883–1931), British air commodore and naval aviation pioneer
- Cid Samson (born 1943), Canadian politician
- Craig Samson (born 1984), Scottish footballer
- David Samson (rabbi) (born 1956), Orthodox rabbi
- David Samson (baseball) (born 1968), former Miami Marlins president; contestant on Survivor: Cagayan
- Edmé Samson (1810–1891), French possible forger of porcelain and pottery
- Elisabeth Samson (1715–1771), Surinamese coffee plantation owner
- Jérôme Samson (born 1987), Canadian National Hockey League player for the Carolina Hurricanes
- Joseph Samson (1888–1957), composer
- Leela Samson (born 1951), Indian bharatanatyam dancer
- Leona D. Samson (born 1952), American biochemist
- Louis Samson (born 1995), German footballer
- Mathewos Samson, American politician
- Michel Samson (born 1972), Canadian politician
- Paul Samson (1953–2002), British heavy metal guitarist
- Polly Samson (born 1962), British novelist, songwriter and journalist
- Sanju Samson (born 1994), Indian cricketer
- Savanna Samson, stage name of American pornographic actress Natalie Oliveros (born 1967)
- Stéphane Samson (born 1975), French footballer
- Valerie Samson (born 1948), American composer and ethnomusicologist

== Patronymic ==
- Sanju Samson (born 1994), Indian cricketer

== See also ==
- Sampson (given name)
- Sampson (surname)
