= Antoine Le Roux =

Abbot of Fécamp Abbey

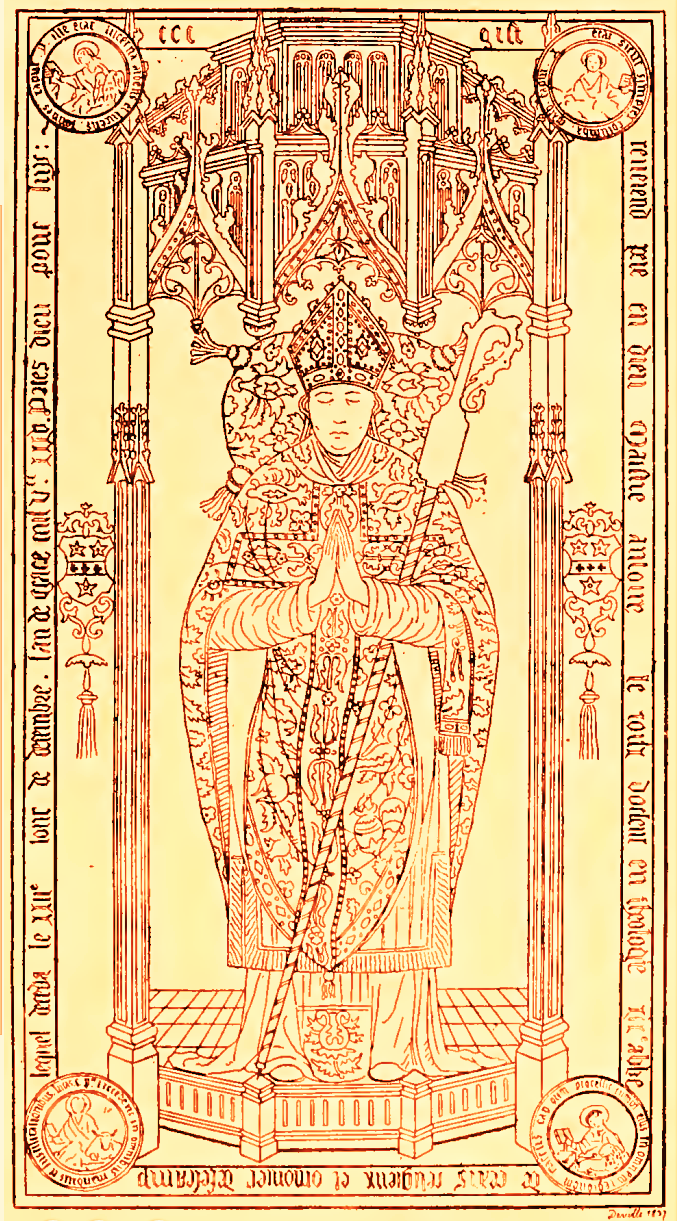
File:LaRoux Tomb.

Antoine Le Roux (died December 22, 1535) was an abbot of Fécamp Abbey and Saint-Georges de Boscherville.

== Biography ==
Following the death of Antoine de La Haye, the monks elected Antoine Le Roux, who was then chaplain of the abbey. However, François Ist opposed his election and appoints Antoine Bohier. There followed a trial to decide between them which found in favor of the latter. As compensation for his loss Antoine Le Roux was named abbot of Saint-Georges de Boscherville.

From 1506 to 1535, Abbot Antoine Le Roux, rebuilt part of the cloister. With him ends the long list of regular abbots

In 1533, still chaplain of Fécamp, he had the large bell of the abbey made at his own expense, which took the name of “Fécamp”. It weighs 12,500 lbs.

Antoine Le Roux died on December 22, 1535. He was buried in front of the high altar of the Saint-Georges de Boscherville abbey. His tombstone from the first quarter of the 16th century in marble was found during an excavation in 1826. He is represented there under a canopy, wearing a miter and dressed in a chasuble. The stone has four evangelists at the corners. the stone was classified as a historic monument as an object on December 5, 1908.
