= Mulugeta =

Mulugeta (Amharic: ሙሉጌታ) is a male given name of Ethiopian origin that may refer to:

- Mulugeta Abate, Ethiopian songwriter and musician
- Mulugeta Bekele (born 1947), Ethiopian physicist and academic
- Mulugeta Buli (1917–1960), Ethiopian military general and politician
- Mulugeta Gebrehiwot, Ethiopian former rebel prior to 1991 and founding director of the Institute for Peace and Security Studies in 2007
- Mulugeta Seraw (1960–1988), Ethiopian student murdered in the United States
- Mulugeta Wami (born 1982), Ethiopian marathon runner
- Mulugeta Wendimu (born 1985), Ethiopian middle- and long-distance runner
- Mulugeta Yeggazu (died 1936), Ethiopian military commander
- Alpha Mulugeta, Ethiopian-American drag performer
- Samson Mulugeta (born 1983), Ethiopian international footballer
