= Joseph Samson =

Joseph Samson may refer to:

- Joseph-Octave Samson (1862–1945), Canadian politician, served as Mayor of Quebec City 1920–1926
- Joseph Samson (Lower Canada politician) (1771–1843), businessman and political figure in Lower Canada
- Joseph Samson (composer) (1888–1957), French church composer and choirmaster
- Joseph Isidore Samson (1793–1871), French actor and playwright
