= Psalter of Charlemagne (disambiguation) =

The Psalter of Charlemagne is an 8th-century manuscript from the Carolingian Empire.

Psalter of Charlemagne may also refer to:

- Dagulf Psalter, also called the Golden Psalter of Charlemagne
- Montpellier Psalter, also called the Psalter of Charlemagne
