= Odo of Arezzo =

Italian composer and theorist (fl. 10th century)

Odo of Arezzo or Abbot Oddo (fl. late 10th century) was a medieval monk who worked in Arezzo, active as composer and music theorist.

== Life and career ==
Little is known about his life, except that he was an Abbot in Arezzo, working under Bishop Donatus of Arezzo. Odo composed a tonary (a book of chants which usually included antiphons and responsories) with a discussion of modes, which survives in twenty manuscripts, four of which contain attributions to Odo. In several of the manuscripts a prologue ascribed in three out of six to Odo is entitled "Formulas quas vobis".
