= Sampson (given name) =

Sampson is the given name of:

People:

- Sampson the Hospitable (died c. 530), venerated as a saint in the Eastern Churches
- Sampson Avard (1800–1869), leader of a band of Mormon vigilantes in Missouri
- Sampson Eardley, 1st Baron Eardley (1744–1824), Jewish-British banker in the City of London, son of Sampson Gideon (see below)
- Sampson Erdeswicke (died 1603), English antiquarian
- Sampson Eure (died 1659), English Member of Parliament
- Sampson Gamgee (1828–1886), British surgeon and indirect namesake of The Lord of the Rings character Sam Gamgee
- Sampson Gideon (1699–1762), Jewish-British banker in the City of London
- Sampson Handley (1872–1962), English surgeon
- Sampson Willis Harris (1809–1857), American politician and lawyer in the South
- Sampson Hele (1582–1655), English Member of Parliament
- Sampson Hopkins (died 1622), English merchant and Member of Parliament
- Sampson Hosking (1888–1974), Australian rules footballer and coach
- Sampson Kempthorne (1809–1873), English architect
- Sampson Lennard (died 1615), English Member of Parliament
- Sampson Lloyd, various members of a family in Birmingham, England; one co-founded a bank which eventually became Lloyds Bank
- Sampson Lort, Welsh Member of Parliament in 1659
- Sampson Low (1797–1886), London bookseller and publisher
- Sampson Mathews (c. 1737 – 1807), American soldier, legislator and college founder
- Sampson Moore (1812–1877), engineer based in Liverpool, England
- Sampson Mordan (1790–1843), British silversmith and co-inventor of the first patented mechanical pencil
- Sampson Nanton (born 1977), journalist and television news presenter in Trinidad and Tobago
- Sampson Sievers (1900–1979), Russian Orthodox Christian priest and mystic
- Sampson Simson (1780–1857), American philanthropist

Biblical figures

- Samson or Sampson, the man of extraordinary strength in the Book of Judges in the Bible

Fictional characters

- Sampson, a character in the play Romeo and Juliet, by William Shakespeare
- Sampson, a character from the animated television series Camp Lazlo

== See also ==
- Samson (name)
