= Berno of Reichenau =

German abbot (c. 978 - 1048)

Berno (c. 978 – 7 June 1048) was the Abbot of Reichenau from his appointment by Henry II, Holy Roman Emperor, in 1008. He reformed the Gregorian chant. He compiled a tonarius, dealing with the organisation of the church chants into 'tones' – eight modes of the Gregorian chant.

Following the reforms initiated under Abbot Immo, who imposed the Benedictine rule at Reichenau, under Berno's guidance the abbey reached its peak as a centre of learning, with a productive scriptorium, as a centre of Benedictine monasticism and eleventh-century liturgical and musical reforms in the German churches. At Reichenau he erected the tall western tower and transept that stand today on the island site of Reichenau-Mittelzell. One of his most famous students was Hermann of Reichenau, who transmitted Arabic mathematics and astronomy to central Europe.

Politically the abbot cleaved to his patrons Henry and to Henry III, duke of Bavaria and eventually Emperor, and wrote many letters and missives to the Hungarian kings Saint Stephen I of Hungary and Peter Orseolo of Hungary, containing various historical information about the Hungarian kingdom of that time useful for the historian. His activity in regard to Hungary was specially important during the reign of Stephen, as his wife was Gisela, the emperor Henry II's sister.
