= Joseph Samson (composer) =

French church composer and choirmaster

Joseph Samson (1888–1957) was a French church composer and choirmaster at the Dijon Cathedral. His books on church music include Musique et Vie intérieure and A l'ombre de la Cathédrale enchantée (1929).

== Recordings ==
- Samson: La Cathédrale enchantée La Maitrise de Dijon, Etienne Meyer 2017
