= Psalter of Charlemagne =

Decorated initial D with interlace and a mermaid, from Psalm 14 (folio 13v)

Full-page initial S with interlace and a dog-like creature, from Psalm 68 (folio 70r)

The Psalter of Charlemagne (shelfmark BN lat. 13159) is an 8th-century Latin manuscript containing the Gallican Psalter with litanies, collects and a tonary.

Because it contains the Laudes regiae prayer for Pope Leo III and King Charles I, it can be dated to between Leo's accession in 795 and Charles's imperial coronation in 800. The manuscript was copied in northern Francia, but scholars disagree about the exact location. It has been argued that it was copied at Saint-Riquier or at Corbie for Saint-Riquier. The selection of alleluias in the tonary at the end of the psalter are said to point to Saint-Riquier as its intended recipient. Specifically, it has been suggested that Charles donated the psalter to Saint-Riquier (then governed by his confidante Angilbert) on the occasion of his visit for Easter 800. Based on the local saints mentioned in the litanies, some scholars locate its production further east, around the Rhine–Meuse delta or the borderland between Neustria and Austrasia. It was probably produced at the same monastery as the Essen Gospels.

The manuscript was copied from either an Irish or Northumbrian original. The text of the Psalms is the Gallican translation, this being the earliest liturgical manuscript containing that version. The psalm headings, which are found in cartouches in the margins, are from Series III, which is mostly found in Spanish copies of the Hebraic Psalter. Each psalm is preceded by a composite introduction that incorporates the mystical headings of Series I and commentary similar to what is found in the Hiberno-Latin commentary on the Psalms (Vatican MS Pal. lat. 68) and the southern French Glosa Psalmorum ex traditione seniorum. Each psalm is followed by a collect. These belong to the Africana or African Series. The Psalter of Charlemagne is the only manuscript witness to this series of collects. They are so called because they were composed (possibly by Fulgentius of Ruspe) in the African province of Byzacena in or about 502 in a monastic community threatened by the Vandals.

Each psalm begins with an illuminated capital. The first 108 psalms follow the eightfold division, with Psalms 1, 17, 26, 38, 52, 68, 80 and 97 having especially prominent capitals, as do Psalms 109 and 118. This division was common in Northumbria and points to Northumbrian influence. The decoration is definitely Insular in inspiration and skillfully done. In initials, interlace predominates, although various dog-like beasts, birds, serpents and mermaids are also used. Although the decoration is otherwise atypical of the Corbie scriptorium, the use of birds was traditional there. There is a pen-and-ink drawing of Christ and two angels that was probably added by a later hand.

The tonary contained in the Psalter of Charlemagne is the oldest surviving work of its genre. It contains pieces for the first five modes only, drawn from the Old Hymnary.
