= William of Volpiano =

Italian monastic reformer, composer, and abbot

Saint William of Volpiano
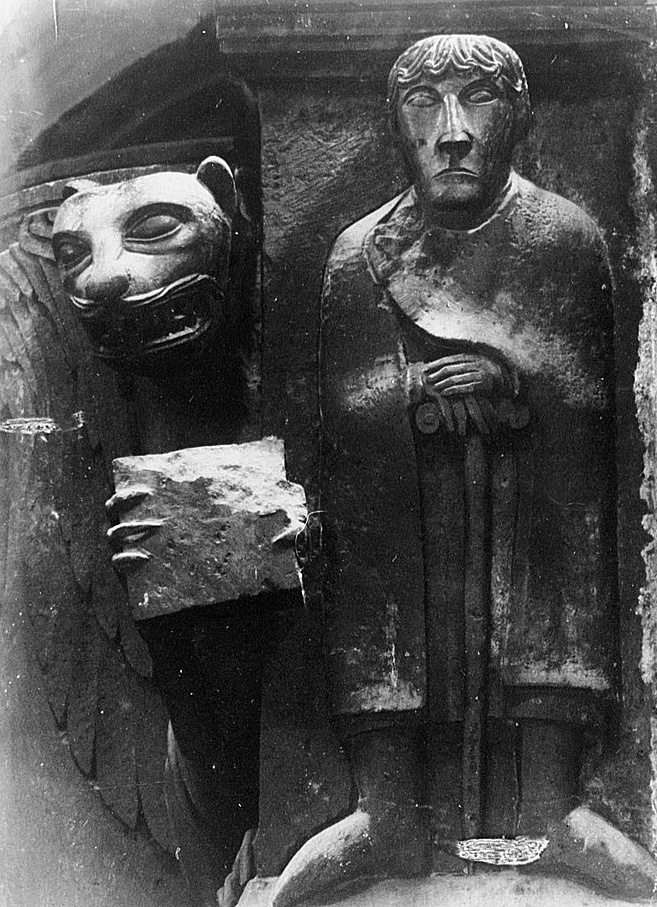
- William of Volpiano; Basilica San Giulio (12th century)
- Born: June/July 962; San Giulio Island, Piedmont, Kingdom of Italy
- Died: 1 January 1031
- Honored in: Eastern Orthodox Church; Roman Catholic Church
- Feast: 1 January

Saint William of Volpiano (Italian: Guglielmo da Volpiano; French: Guillaume de Volpiano, also of Dijon, of Saint-Benignus, or of Fécamp; June/July 962 – 1 January 1031) was a Northern Italian monastic reformer, composer, and founding abbot of numerous abbeys in Burgundy, Italy and Normandy.

== Life and career ==
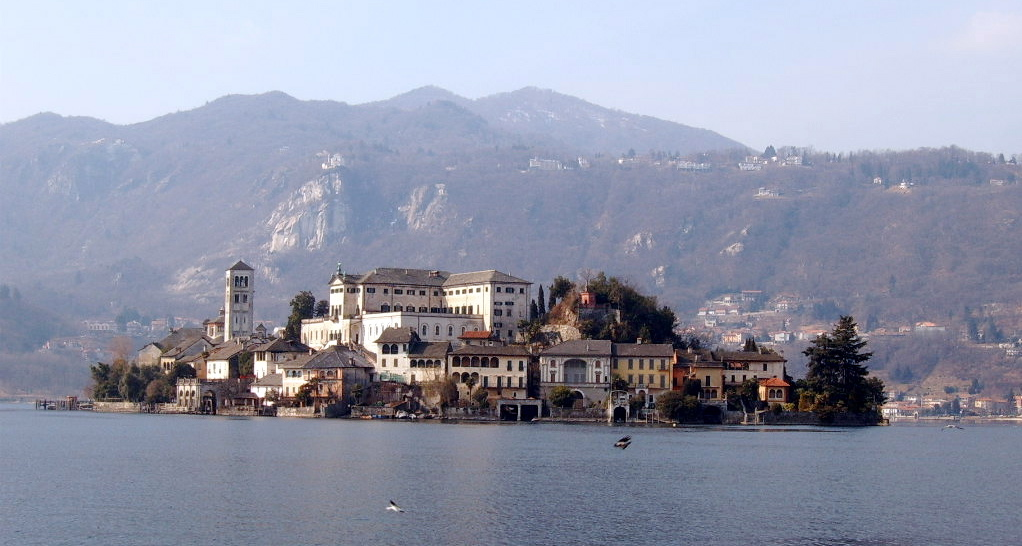
Isola San Giulio; William of Volpiano was born here in 962 AD

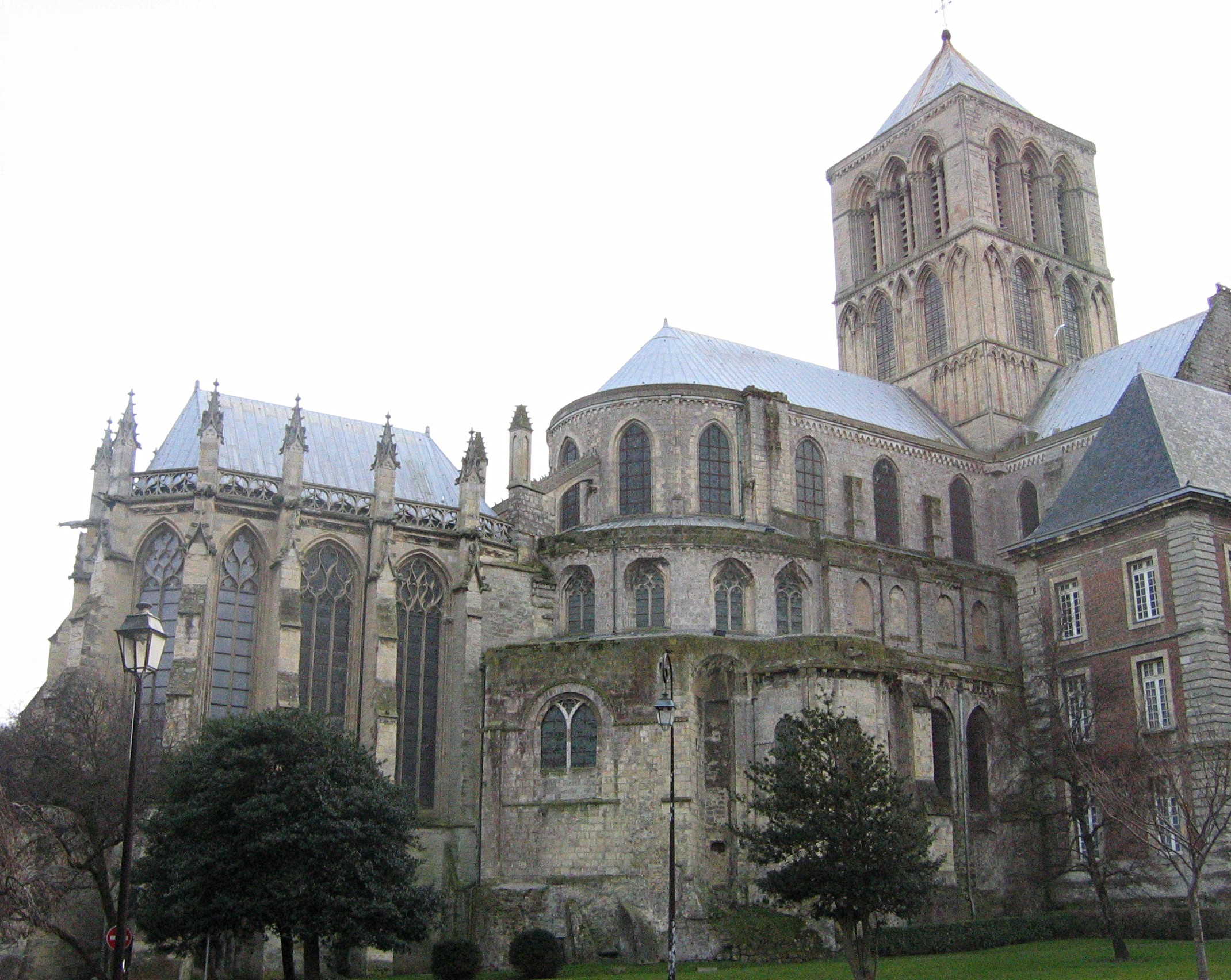
Abbey of Fécamp

Not much is known about him. The main source is a Vita of the monk Raoul Glaber, a novice who accompanied William and who sometimes regarded his master as a rival, but also as a mentor who encouraged his work as a chronicler.

William was born in 969 in the family citadel on the island of San Giulio, Lake Orta, Novara, Piedmont. The fourth son of Count Robert of Volpiano, he was born during an assault on the citadel by the Emperor Otto. The assault being successful, Otto became the sponsor and patron of Count Robert's son.

At the age of seven, he began his education at the Benedictine abbey at Locadio, Vercelli. He became a monk at this abbey. In 987, he became a monk at the Abbey of Cluny under Saint Majolus. Zealous for reform, Saint Majolus had reorganized Saint Sernin Abbey on the Rhône River.

William was ordained in 990 and served as abbot of Saint Benignus' Abbey at Dijon, dedicated to Saint Benignus of Dijon. Under William's direction, and his zeal for the Cluniac reform, St. Benignus' became a centre of spirituality, education, and culture. It also became the mother house of some forty other monasteries in Burgundy, Lorraine, Normandy, and northern Italy.

After a trip back to Italy around 995, he studied the plans for Dijon Abbey and amended them in collaboration with Upper Italian workers and master masons who were going to work in Burgundy and Normandy.

In 1001, he was called to be the abbot of the recently refounded Abbey of Fécamp by Richard II, where the Dukes of Normandy had their palace and had chosen to be buried. William had to supervise the reconstruction and was to found several satellite abbeys in Normandy such as Bernay. In 1015 he introduced monastic reforms to Jumièges Abbey. which he helped to complete.

He was chosen as building contractor for Mont Saint-Michel in the 11th century. He designed the Romanesque church of the abbey, daringly placing the transept crossing at the top of the mount. Many underground crypts and chapels had to be built to compensate for this weight. These formed the basis for the supportive upward structure that can be seen today. He also rebuilt or completed the abbeys at Troarn and Saint-Germain-des-Prés.

He died in 1031 of natural causes at Fécamp.

== See also ==
- William of Volpiano's fully notated tonary for the use at the Abbey Saint-Bénigne of Dijon

== Sources ==
- William of Volpiano. "Montpellier, Bibliothèque interuniversitaire de Médecine, Ms. H159, pp.7-322". Tonary-Gradual & Antiphonary of the Abbey St. Bénigne in Dijon (about 1000). Archived from the original on 25 February 2021.
- Raoul Glaber. "Paris, Bibliothèque nationale de France, fonds lat., ms. 5390, ff.222r-230r". Vita Domni VVillelmi Abbatis primi Fiscannensis [Life of Sir William the first Abbot of Fécamp] (11th century).

== Editions ==
- Mocquereau, André, ed. (1901). Codex H. 159 de la Bibliothèque de l'École de médecine de Montpellier: Antiphonarium tonale missarum, XIe siècle. Paléographie musicale. Vol. 7. Solesmes: Abbaye Saint-Pierre de Solesmes.
- Mocquereau, André, ed. (1905). Codex H. 159 de la Bibliothèque de l'École de médecine de Montpellier: Antiphonarium tonale missarum, XIe siècle. Paléographie musicale. Vol. 8. Solesmes: Abbaye Saint-Pierre de Solesmes.
- Bulst, Neithard; John France; Paul Reynolds, eds. (1989). "Vita domni Willelmi abbatis". Rodulfus Glaber Opera. Oxford Medieval Texts. Oxford: Clarendon Press. pp. 154–299. ISBN 9780198222415.

== Studies ==
- Douglas, David C. (May 1964). William the Conqueror: The Norman Impact Upon England. Berkeley & Los Angeles: UCAP.
- Gazeau, Véronique; Monique Goullet (2008). Guillaume de Volpiano. Un Réformateur en son temps (962 - 1031). Caen: Publications du CRAHM. ISBN 978-2-902685-61-5.
- Huglo, Michel (2001). "Guillaume de Dijon". Grove Music Online. Oxford: Oxford University Press. doi:10.1093/gmo/9781561592630.article.11982. ISBN 978-1-56159-263-0. (subscription, Wikilibrary access, or UK public library membership required)
- Morris, Marc (2012). The Norman Conquest: The Battle of Hastings and the Fall of Anglo-Saxon England'. ISBN 978-1-4481-3602-5.
