= Samson Rausuk =

Lithuanian-British librarian and Talmudic scholar

Rabbi Samson Rausuk
- שמשון ראוזוק
- Born: 1793; Vilkovishk, Polish–Lithuanian Commonwealth
- Died: September 11, 1877 (aged 84); London, United Kingdom
- Occupations: Librarian; Hebraist; Talmudist; poet
- Writing career
- Language: Hebrew
- Genre: Occasional poetry

Samson H. Rausuk (Hebrew: שמשון ראוזוק, romanized: Šimšon Rauzuq; 1793 – 11 September 1877) was a Lithuanian-British librarian, Hebraist, Talmudic scholar, and poet. He was regarded as the 'poet laureate' of the London Jewish community for nearly thirty years.

== Biography ==
Rausuk was born in Vilkovishk, Lithuania, where he received a traditional Litvak yeshiva education, and pursued a career as a merchant. On the occasion of the visit of Sir Moses Montefiore to Russia in 1846, Rausuk was one of the delegates appointed to receive him. He moved to London in 1848, and held the post of librarian to the Leadenhall Street Beth Hamedrash for nearly a quarter of a century.

During this time, he published many of his Hebrew compositions, often dealing with subjects of passing interest to the local community, and contributed to the Jewish Chronicle. Among Rausuk's poems were odes to Montefiore in commemoration of his missions to Romania and Morocco. He also contributed to a volume of translations of Martin Farquhar Tupper's A Hymn for All Nations, other contributors to which included William Hodge Mill, Thomas Robinson, W. Burckhardt Barker, Benjamin Hall Kennedy, Richard Shilleto, Rowland Williams, W. Gifford Cookesley, Morris Williams, John O'Donovan, Thomas McLauchlan, George Métivier, Gabriele Rossetti, and Kah-Ge-Ga-Gah-Bowh.

== Publications ==
- Purim [A Poem] (in Hebrew). London: s.n. 1849.
- Kina al Mavet ha-Ḥakham M. Meir Yosef [Elegy on the Death of M. Meir Yosef] (in Hebrew). London: s.n. 1849.
- Shir [A Poem, Dedicated to Master Alfred Cohen, &c.] (in Hebrew). London: s.n. 1849.
- Shir [A Poem, Dedicated to Master Mordecai Adler, &c.] (in Hebrew). London: s.n. 1850.
- Shir Yedidut [A Poem, Composed in Honour of the Marriage of Henry Solomon, Esq. and Miss Sarah Adler, &c.] (in Hebrew). London: s.n. 1850.
- Shir Yedidut [A Poem, in Honour of the Nuptials of J. Sebag, Esq., and Miss Adelaide Cohen] (in Hebrew and English). London: s.n. 1851.
- Tefilah le-Moshe [A Hymn, in Honour of Master Moses Moses, on His Attaining the Age of 13, on the 8th of April, 5611 A.M.] (in Hebrew). London: s.n. 1851.
- Shir Tehilah [A Poem, in Honour of Master Naphtali Hirsch Adler, on His Attaining the Age of 13, on the 4th of June, 5612 A.M.] (in Hebrew). London: s.n. 1852.
- Shir Yedidut [A Poem, Composed in Honour of the Nuptials of A. H. Moses, and H. Cohen] (in Hebrew). London: s.n. 1855.
- Shir Yedidut [A Poem, Composed in Honour of the Nuptials of L. L. Cohen, Esq.] (in Hebrew). London: s.n. 1856.
- Shir Yedidut [A Poem, Composed in Honour of the Nuptials of H. D. Behrend, M.D., &c. and Miss Priscilla Moses. On Wednesday, March 4, 5617.] (in Hebrew). London: s.n. 1857.
- Shir Tehilah [A Poem, in Honour of Master A. Keyser, &c.] (in Hebrew). London: s.n. 1857.
- Shir [A Poem, in Honour of Masters B. and J. L. Cohen, &c.] (in Hebrew). London: s.n. 1858.
- Shir Yedidut [A Poem Composed in Honour of the Nuptials of J. Israel, Esq. and M. Adler] (in Hebrew). London: s.n. 1858.
- Shir Tehilah [Poem, Commemorative of the Successful Mission of Sir Moses Montefiore, Bart. to the Court of Morocco: Composed on His Safe Return, April 7th, 5624–1864] (in Hebrew and English). Translated by Samuel, Sampson. London: P. Vallentine. 1864.
- Shir [A Poem in Honour of Master A. M. Sebag, &c.] (in Hebrew). London: s.n. 1866.
- Kol Rina ve-Yeshua [The Voice of Joy and Salvation: An Ode to Commemorate the Providential Success, which Attended Israel's Illustrious Champion, Sir Moses Montefoire on the Occasion of his Mission to Roumania] (in Hebrew and English). Translated by Henry, Michael. London: P. Vallentine. 1867.
- Shir Yedidut [A Poem Composed in Honour of the Marriage of B. Cohen and L. Merton] (in Hebrew). London: s.n. 1870.
- Shir Yedidut [A Poem Composed in Honour of the Marriage of N. Cohen and J. M. Waley] (in Hebrew). London: s.n. 1873.
