= Dijon Cathedral =

Cathedral located in Dijon, Burgundy, France

Dijon Cathedral Cathedral of St Benignus of Dijon Cathédrale Saint-Bénigne de Dijon
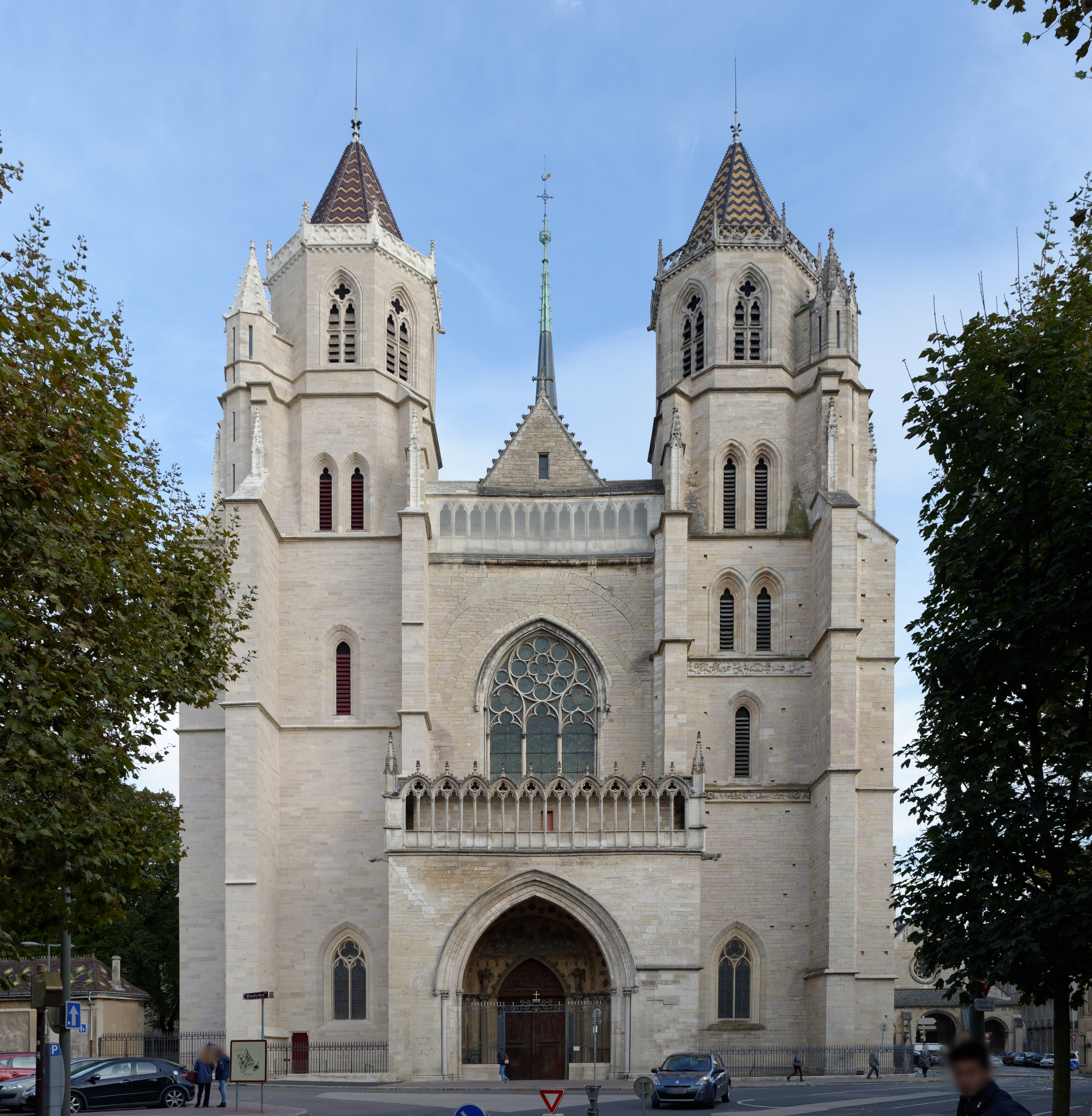

Religion
- Affiliation: Roman Catholic Church
- Province: Archdiocese of Dijon
- Rite: Roman
- Ecclesiastical or organisational status: Cathedral
- Year consecrated: 1393
- Status: Active

Location
- Location: Dijon, France
- Interactive map of Dijon Cathedral; Cathedral of St Benignus of Dijon; Cathédrale Saint-Bénigne de Dijon
- Coordinates: 47°19′17″N 5°2′4″E

Architecture
- Type: Church
- Style: Gothic, Romanesque
- Groundbreaking: 1280
- Completed: 1325

Dijon Cathedral, or the Cathedral of Saint Benignus of Dijon (French: Cathédrale Saint-Bénigne de Dijon), is a Roman Catholic church located in the town of Dijon, Burgundy, France, and dedicated to Saint Benignus of Dijon. The Gothic cathedral building, constructed between 1280 and 1325, and dedicated on 9 April 1393, is a listed national monument.

Originating as the church of the Abbey of St. Benignus, it became the seat of the Diocese of Dijon during the French Revolution, replacing the previous cathedral when it was secularised, and has been the seat of the succeeding Archbishopric of Dijon since the elevation of the diocese in 2002.

== History ==
The origins of the cathedral date to 3rd century CE, when a shrine to Saint Benignus was erected on the site of the current church. This structure was later upgraded to a basilica built over the supposed sarcophagus of Saint Benignus, which was placed in a crypt constructed for it by Saint Gregory of Langres in 511 CE; the basilica over the crypt was completed in 535. From the early 9th century, St. Bénigne was the personal monastery of the bishops of Langres. In 869 Isaac, Bishop of Langres, re-founded it as a Benedictine abbey, and restored the basilica at the same time.

In 989 Bruno, Bishop of Langres, requested Mayeul, Abbot of Cluny, to send monks to re-settle the abbey, grown decadent, as a Cluniac house. In 990 William of Volpiano was appointed the new abbot. By 1002, the ruin of the previous building had been razed and construction began on a new Romanesque structure designed by William, consisting of a subterranean church round the sarcophagus of Benignus, a ground floor church for worship, and a rotunda, 17 metres in diameter, on three levels in the place of the apse, linking the two. (Note: The construction the new abbey over the next decades became soon one of the most ambitious and most prestigious buildings of its time, since it exceeded even the dimensions of its contemporary mother monastery Cluny Abbey (known as Cluny II). See the reconstruction by Kenneth J. Conant (1965).) Dedicated in October 1016 by Lambert I, this suite of buildings was decorated in the ornate Cluniac style, of which only a few traces survive.

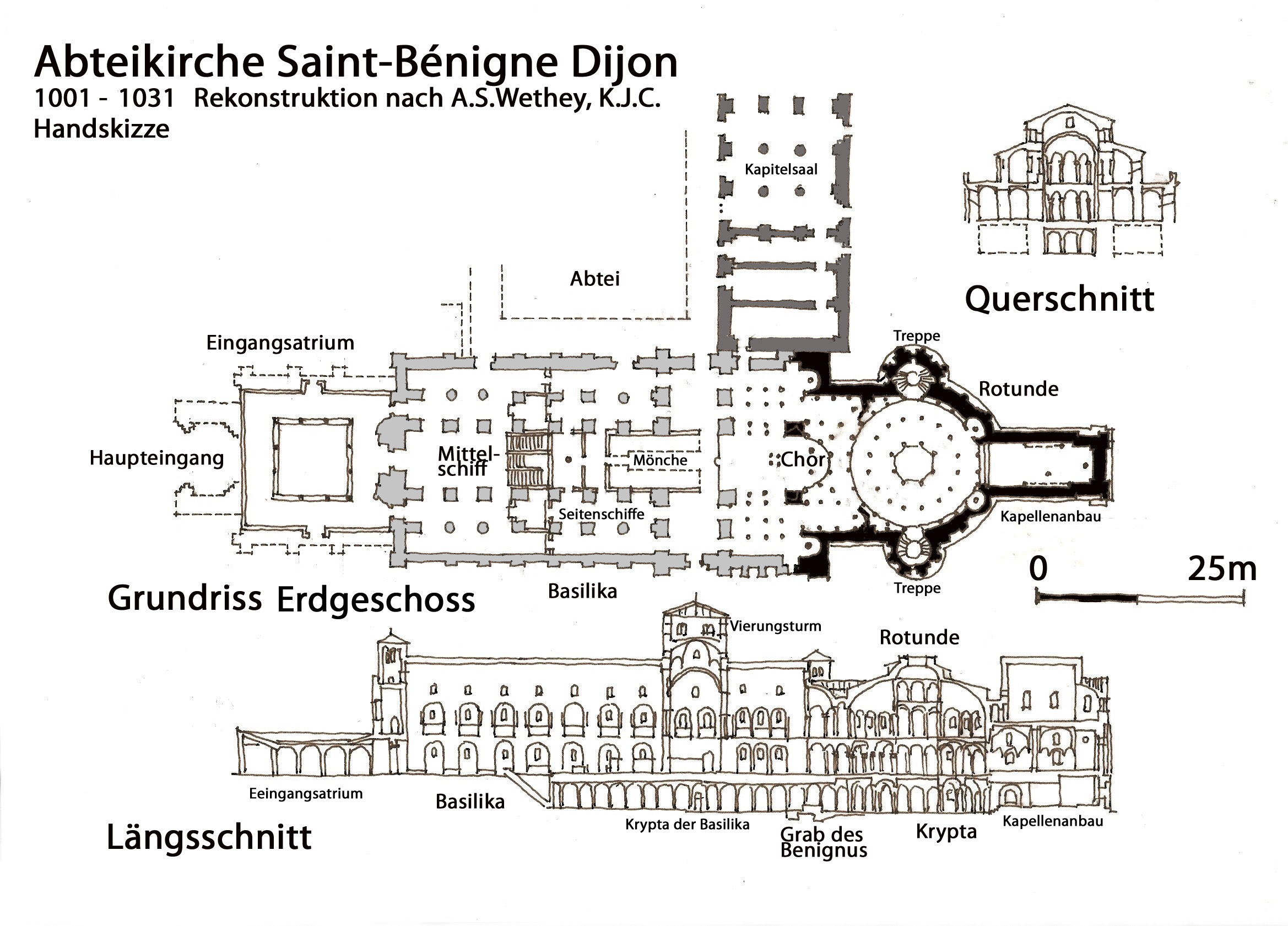
Reconstruction of William of Volpiano's Abbey by Ann Wethey and Kenneth Conant

In 1137 a fire destroyed most of the town of Dijon and damaged the monastery and its church. The repaired building was consecrated by Pope Eugene III in 1147.

In 1272 the crossing tower collapsed, destroying the whole of the upper church and severely damaging the subterranean one, and smashing some of the supporting columns of the rotunda. Then the abbot, Hugh of Arc, of a powerful Burgundian family, was able, thanks to his contacts, to mobilise enough support to begin the construction of a new Gothic abbey church in 1281. Progress was at first rapid, and at Hugh's death in 1300 the building was close to completion. Progress slowed, however, and the work was not finished until 1325. The new church, unlike its Cluniac predecessor, is noted for its plainness and severity.

The abbey was secularised during the French Revolution, but the church was made, firstly, a parish church, and then in 1792 the cathedral of the Diocese of Dijon. The rotunda was however destroyed at that time; all that remains is the lowest storey, which was excavated in the 19th century and has since been reworked as a crypt.

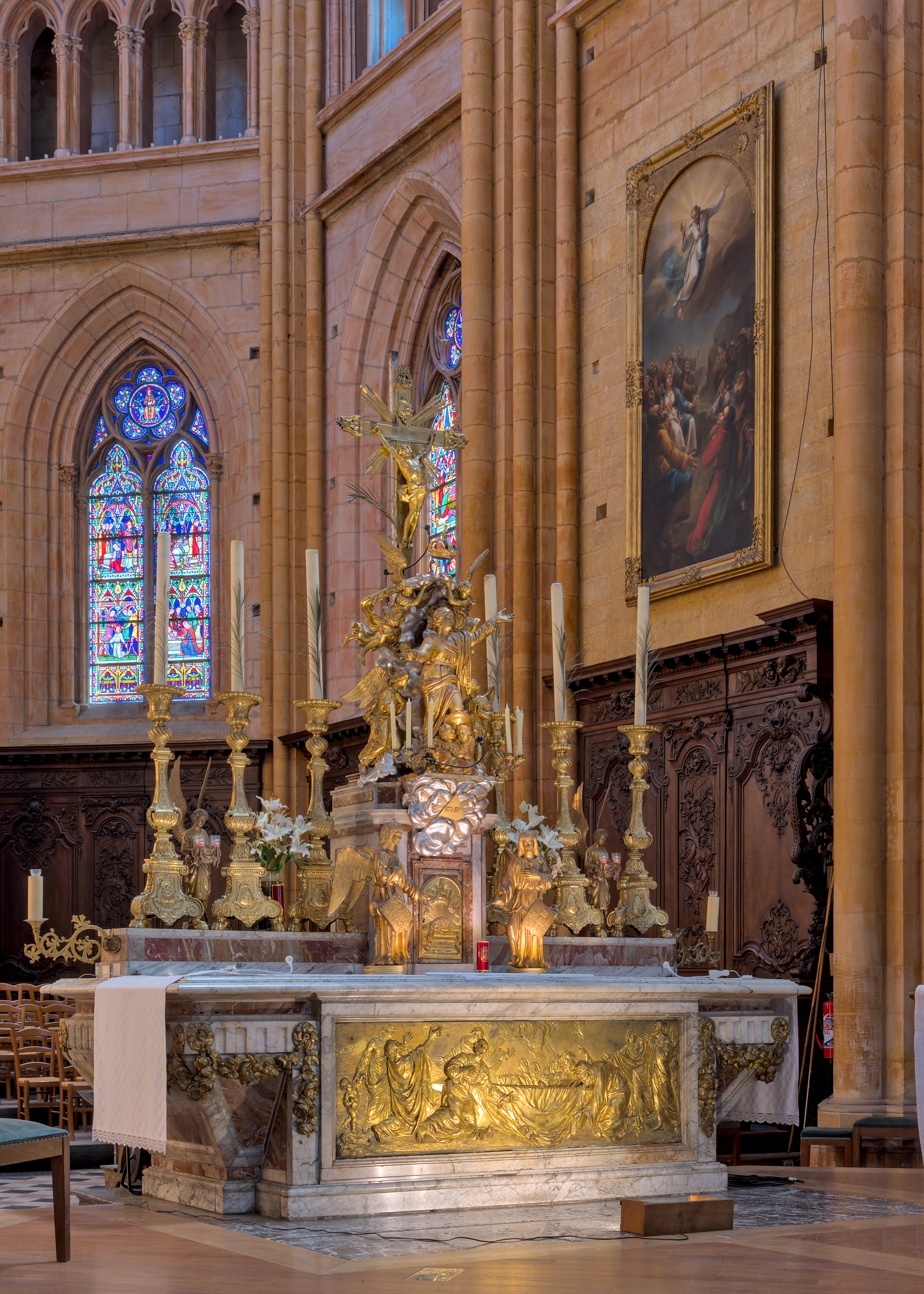
Choir and altar, Dijon Cathedral

== Burials ==
- Philip the Good
- Władysław the White, Polish Duke of the Piast dynasty

== See also ==
- List of Gothic Cathedrals in Europe
- High medieval domes

== Sources ==
- Dijon Cathedral at Structurae
- Catholic Hierarchy: Diocese and Archdiocese of Dijon
- Diocese of Dijon official website (in French)
- Dijoon-free.fr - Dijon tourist and local history site (in French)
- Saint-Bénigne de Dijon on the site Bourgogne Romane (in French)
