= Samson Mulugeta =

Ethiopian footballer

Personal information
- Place of birth: Addis Ababa
- Position: Defender

Team information
- Current team: Saint George S.C.

International career
| Years | Team | Apps | (Gls) |
| 2003 | Ethiopia | 12 | |

Samson Mulugeta (Amharic: ሳምሶን ሙሉጌታ; born 14 December 1983 in Addis Ababa) is an Ethiopian footballer. Since the 2002–2003 season, he has played for Saint-George SA. Mulugeta is a defender and is part of the Ethiopia national football team.
