= Fécamp Abbey =

Benedictine abbey in Fécamp, Seine-Maritime

Coordinates: 49°45′19.2″N 0°22′54.2″E

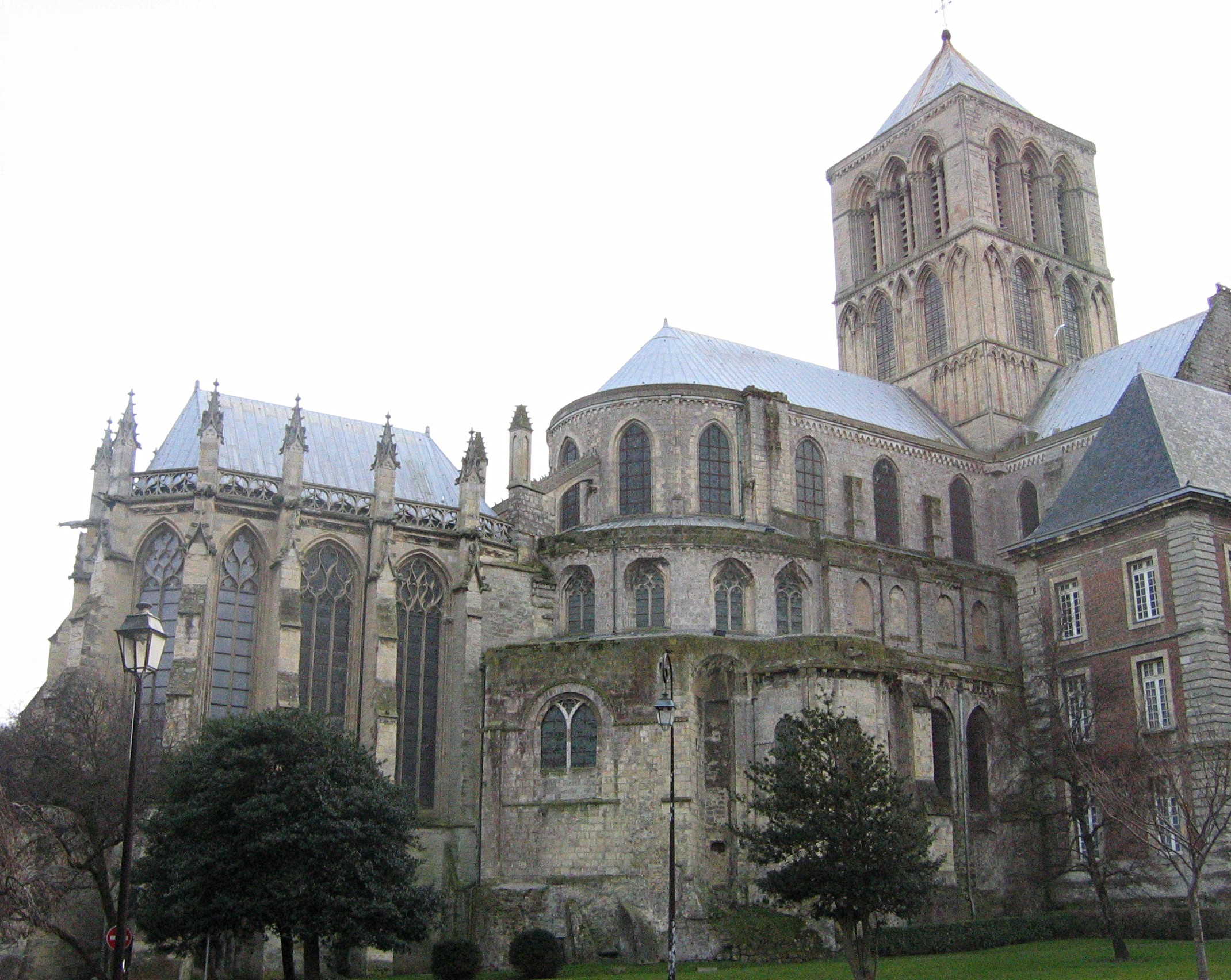
Abbey church, Fécamp

The Abbey of the Holy Trinity at Fécamp, commonly known as Fécamp Abbey (French: Abbaye de la Trinité de Fécamp), is a Benedictine abbey in Fécamp, Seine-Maritime, Upper Normandy, France.

The abbey is known as the first producer of bénédictine, a herbal liqueur based on brandy.

== First foundation ==
Around 658, Waningus, a Merovingian count, founded a nunnery here, which was destroyed by the Vikings in 841. Another convent he founded in 660, near the site of the Precious Relic, was destroyed by the Vikings in 842. Around the ducal palace, the foundations of two chapels have been found.

== Second foundation ==
In the 990s Richard I of Normandy, who was born in Fécamp, where there was the main ducal residence, began rebuilding the monastery where he intended to be buried. It was Richard II who invited the zealous William of Volpiano in 1001 to rekindle the life of the abbey under the Cluniac Benedictine rules as part of a general strengthening of Norman monasticism. Williams's successor, John of Fécamp was also influential.

Richard I and Richard II were originally buried outside, and were later interred in 1162 by Henry II of England within the southern transept of the Gothic abbey church.

The remains of the two dukes were moved several times and reburied in several places, finally being placed in lead boxes and reburied again in the southern transept in 1956. In February 2016, French, Danish and Norwegian researchers opened the lead boxes in order to conduct DNA analysis of the remains. Radiocarbon dating of the remains showed that neither skeleton could be that of Richard I or Richard II. One skeleton dated from the third century BCE, the other from the eighth century CE, both long before the lifetimes of Richard I and Richard II.

William of Volpiano is buried in one of the northern chapels.

== Mid-eleventh century ==
The abbey at Fécamp was critical in the Norman conquest of England. Edward the Confessor granted the royal minster church in Steyning to the abbey, in gratitude to his Norman protectors during his exile. With its large, wealthy manor lands and thriving port, this grant was to take effect after the death of Aelfwine, Bishop of Winchester, who had charge of Steyning. The bishop died in 1047 and ecclesiastical jurisdiction then passed directly to Pope Clement II. In the same way, Fécamp Abbey itself answered to no Norman bishop, only to the Pope. The gift was later confirmed by William the Conqueror.

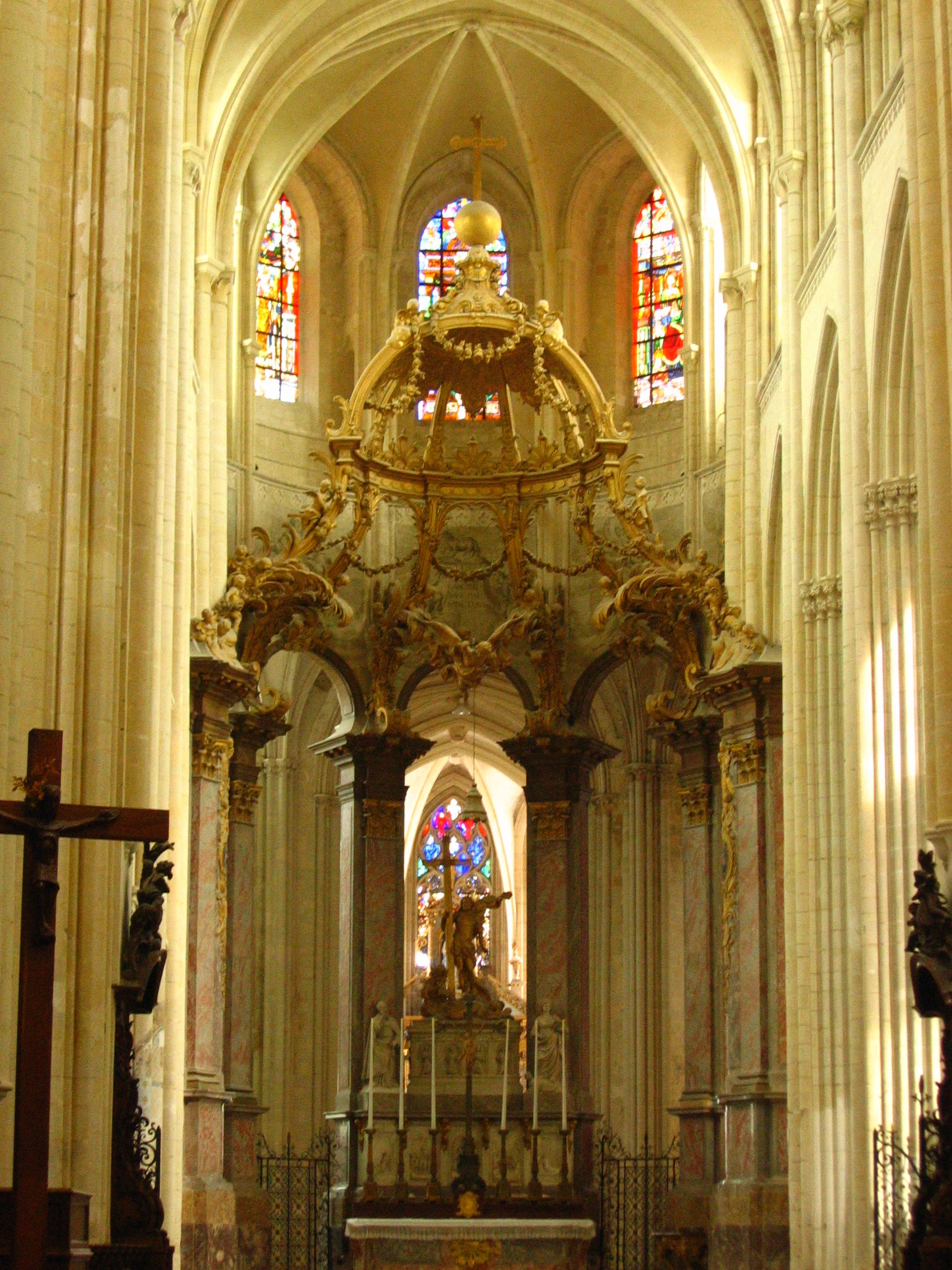
The chancel of the church at Fécamp Abbey.

A nearby port with land around Rye, Winchelsea and Hastings had already been given to the same abbey by King Cnut, to honour a promise made by his wife Emma of Normandy's first husband King Aethelred. The monks had hardly had time to settle in when in 1052 Godwin, Earl of Wessex, expelled them from Steyning and seized it for himself. His son Harold decided to keep it upon his accession, rather than restore it to them. This made commercial and strategic sense (Harold did not want a Norman toehold at a potential invasion port), but William responded by swearing on a knife before setting out for England to recover it for the monks.

This gained him a ship from the abbey and, upon his victory at Hastings, he made good his promise and returned Steyning to the abbey, with whom it remained until the 15th century.

The charter acquitted the grantees of all earthly service and subjection to barons, princes, and others, and gave them all royal liberties, custom, and justice over all matters arising in their land; and threatened any who should infringe these liberties with an amercement of £100 in gold.

They moved the remains of the local saint, Cuthman of Steyning, to the mother abbey at Fécamp. The abbey also provided William with Remigius de Fécamp, the first Bishop of Lincoln.

== Church architecture ==
The abbey church dedicated to the Holy Trinity was built between 1175 and 1220 using the cream-coloured stone of Caen. Under the Plantagenets, the scriptorium at Fécamp produced numerous illuminated manuscripts.

== See also ==
- Carolingian architecture
- Carolingian art
- List of Carolingian monasteries

== Sources ==
- Brown, R. Allen (1994), The Normans and the Norman Conquest, Boydell & Brewer

- Media related to Fécamp Abbey at Wikimedia Commons
- High-resolution 360° Panoramas and Images of Fécamp Abbey | Art Atlas
