= Saint-Gabriel-Brécy Priory =

Priory in Calvados, France

Saint‑Gabriel‑Brécy Priory
- Prieuré de Saint‑Gabriel‑Brécy
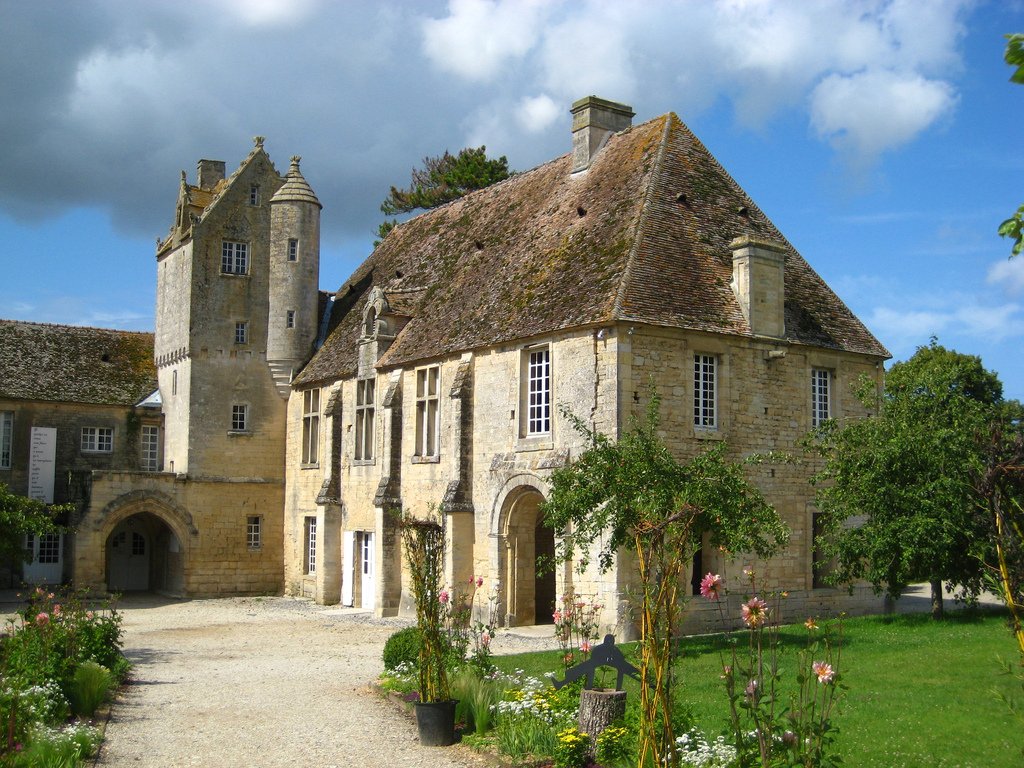
- The prior's lodgings

- Location within France

Monastery information
- Order: Benedictine
- Established: 1058
- Disestablished: 1790s
- Diocese: Bayeux

Site
- Location: Saint-Gabriel-Brécy, Calvados, France
- Coordinates: 49.2794°N 0.5653°W
- Public access: Yes

Saint-Gabriel-Brécy Priory was a Benedictine priory 10 km from the coast between Caen and Bayeux. It is sited in the town of Saint-Gabriel-Brécy, Calvados, France. A 13th century gate-tower survives, with ogive vaulting on sculpted capitals. It was adjoined by a now-lost guesthouse. The cornice is sculpted with small three-point arches. The vaulted refectory dates to the late 13th century. A keep was built to serve as a prison in the 15th century, whilst the Renaissance-style courtroom was built towards the end of the 16th century. A dovecote is now lost.

== History ==
It was founded by three monks sent there in 1058 by John of Fécamp, abbot of the Benedictine Fécamp Abbey. He sent them to found a priory there at the request of Richard, lord of Creully, whose brother Vitalis was a Benedictine monk at Fécamp and later became abbot of Bernay Abbey and Westminster Abbey. That year forty people signed a charter founding the priory, including John himself, William, Duke of Normandy and his wife Matilda of Flanders. It cost 312 livres 2 sols, two horses and 24 sheep. The priory was granted lands in over 24 parishes from Ouistreham to Port-en-Bessin, several mills (including two in Saint-Gabriel itself) and two fisheries (including one in Saint-Gabriel). William and Matilda also signed the complementary charter of 1069 and with their son Robert the charter of confirmation in 1080. Raoul de Grosparmi, apostolic legate and guardian of the seals to Louis IX of France, signed a charter at the priory, whilst Louis XI of France gave it 16 écus on the road between Douvres-la-Delivrande and Mont-Saint-Michel, where he was going on pilgrimage.

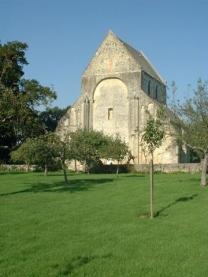
The remains of the priory church.

The Romanesque priory church was built around 1140, at the same time as the village church. They were both consecrated in June 1228 by the bishop of Sion. The high altar at the priory church was dedicated to the Holy Trinity and Michael the Archangel, whilst that in the village church was dedicated to Thomas Becket, canonised less than a century earlier. The priory church's apse has a ceiling painting of the Annunciation, probably dating to the 14th century.

The prior oversaw the distribution of one pound of bread to the poor each Thursday from the feast of St Luke (18 October) to that of St Clare (18 July), as well as presiding over the fair on the feast of Saint Gabriel (16 October). A court began sitting on 16 October to try capital and other cases, presided over by the prior. The priory lands also included the town gibbet. Its buildings were damaged in the Hundred Years' War but rebuilt. Henry V of England confirmed the priory's temporal rights but towards the end of the Middle Ages the monks abandoned communal life and began living in separate lodges, although they still came together for worship and prayer. From 1575 Louis de Lorraine, cardinal de Guise, was prior commendatory to the priory. The French Wars of Religion and the commendatory regime meant that from 1674 the priory was organised differently - the monks returned to Fécamp and the priory's lands were entrusted to a fermier général. The priory church was still used for mass on Sundays, celebrated by monks from the abbaye de Saint-Vigor in Bayeux.

At the French Revolution the priory was confiscated, sold and turned into a farm, whilst the town council bought the tower. The priory church's nave was demolished in 1750 and only its choir remains. The sieur de Gribeauval, inventor of the light cannon, stayed at the priory at the same time as the régiment d'Aquitaine and the régiment de Saintonge in 1778. The church passed into state ownership in 1844 after being listed as a historic monument in 1840. In March 1914 it was bought by monsieur Emmanuel Fauchier Delavigne and his wife and after major rebuilding works they used it to house the first ever private horticulture school in France from 1929 onwards, now the École du paysage et de l'horticulture. The town and priory were liberated on D-Day (6 June 1944) by soldiers of the Tyne-Tees Regiment and it took in refugees from Caen during the battle of Caen soon afterwards. A cultural association was set up in 2003 to revive the site and on 1 January 2008 the state passed ownership of the priory to the Calvados department.

== List of priors ==
- 1058–1069 : Turquetil
- c. 1106 : Nicolas
- 1188–1219 : Roger
- 1188–1219 : Julien (subordinate to the abbot of Fécamp), Raoul (prior)
- c. 1231 : Geoffroy de Caen
- c. 1255 : Gervais de Norrey
- 1286–1288 : Richard de Plumetot
- c. 1317 : Guillaume Champion
- 1331–1346 : Geoffroy de La Palue
- c. 1362 : Henri Goribout (sub prior)
- c. 1370 : Pierre de Joinville
- c. 1374 : Guillaume de Blangy
- c. 1392 : Raoul Flament
- 1423–1424 : Thomas Langlois (prior) and Robert de Franqueville (sub prior)
- 1425–1430 : Philippe de Plumetot
- c. 1430 : Robert de Franqueville (sub prior)
- 1438–1459 : Guillaume Étienne
- c. 1462 : Radulphe Coreul
- 1468–1480 : Robert Desmarets
- 1483–1489 : Pierre Duchâtelet

== Bibliography (in French) ==
- Statistique monumentale du Calvados tome 1, Arcisse de Caumont, L. Jouan, 1898
- Trois mois avec les Anglais, 6 juin – 27 août 1944 (A Saint-Gabriel, Calvados) , Marcelle Fauchier Delavigne
- Lucien Musset, Normandie romane 1, éd. Zodiaque, La Pierre qui vire, 1975 Fauchier Delavigne, réédition SAEP, 1984.
- Le prieuré de Saint-Gabriel, dom Jacques Dubois, OSB, SAEP, 1985.
- Le Prieuré Saint-Gabriel, Association culturelle du Prieuré Saint-Gabriel, MOSAÏQUE, édité en Normandie., 2009.
- Prieuré Saint-Gabriel, un élan monastique normand au XI siecle, Pierre Bouet, Véronique Gazeau, Isabelle Havard, Manon Six, Claudie Fauchier Delavigne, Actes du colloque tenus le 20 septembre 2008, éd. Cahiers du temps, 2011.

== External links (in French) ==
- Site de l'Association du prieuré Saint-Gabriel
- Sites des Abbayes normandes
- Site de l'École du paysage de Saint-Gabriel-Brécy
- Blog des élèves en formation bac pro à l'École du paysage et de l'horticulture
