= Vitalis of Bernay =

Vitalis of Creuilly or Vitalis of Bernay (died 19 June 1085) was a Benedictine monk from Normandy. Sources on his life include the early 15th century history of the Abbey by John Flete and the 1751 An history of the Church of St. Peter, Westminster, commonly called Westminster Abbey by Richard Widmore.

He was a monk at Fécamp Abbey before becoming abbot of Bernay Abbey around 1055. On 28 May 1065 he buried his friend Osbern, Abbot of Saint-Evroul, who had died the previous year. He was a confidant of John, abbot of Fecamp, who in 1058 charged him with setting up Saint-Gabriel-Brécy Priory - its establishment had been requested by Vitalis' brother Richard, lord of Creully. Finally he was appointed the third abbot of Westminster Abbey by William I of England on the advice of Lanfranc, the first Norman Archbishop of Canterbury. William also granted Vitalis a manor at Doddington, Lincolnshire, whilst Vitalis' brother Osbern took over at Bernay. Vitalis may have been reluctant to come - Widmore states that William wrote a letter to John of Fecamp demanding his consent to sending Vitalis. Flete states his year of appointment as 1078, but it is stated as 1076 in the Winchester Annals and as 1077 in the Anglo-Saxon Chronicle.

He held the post until his death and continued the building work on the abbey as well as supervising work on Westminster Palace and commissioning the monk Sulcard to write a number of tracts on the Abbey's history. Vitalis was buried beneath a small white stone at the head of Abbot Gislebert in the south cloister of the Abbey - its Latin inscription stated that "He who derived his name from life [vita], Abbot Vitalis, at death's summons passed on and lies here". A tapestry and a silk cloth were placed on his grave annually on 19 June, with two candles burning from Vespers until the end of Requiem Mass on 20 June. His grave is now unmarked.
