= Bernay Abbey =

Abbey in Eure, France

- Abbaye Notre-Dame de Bernay
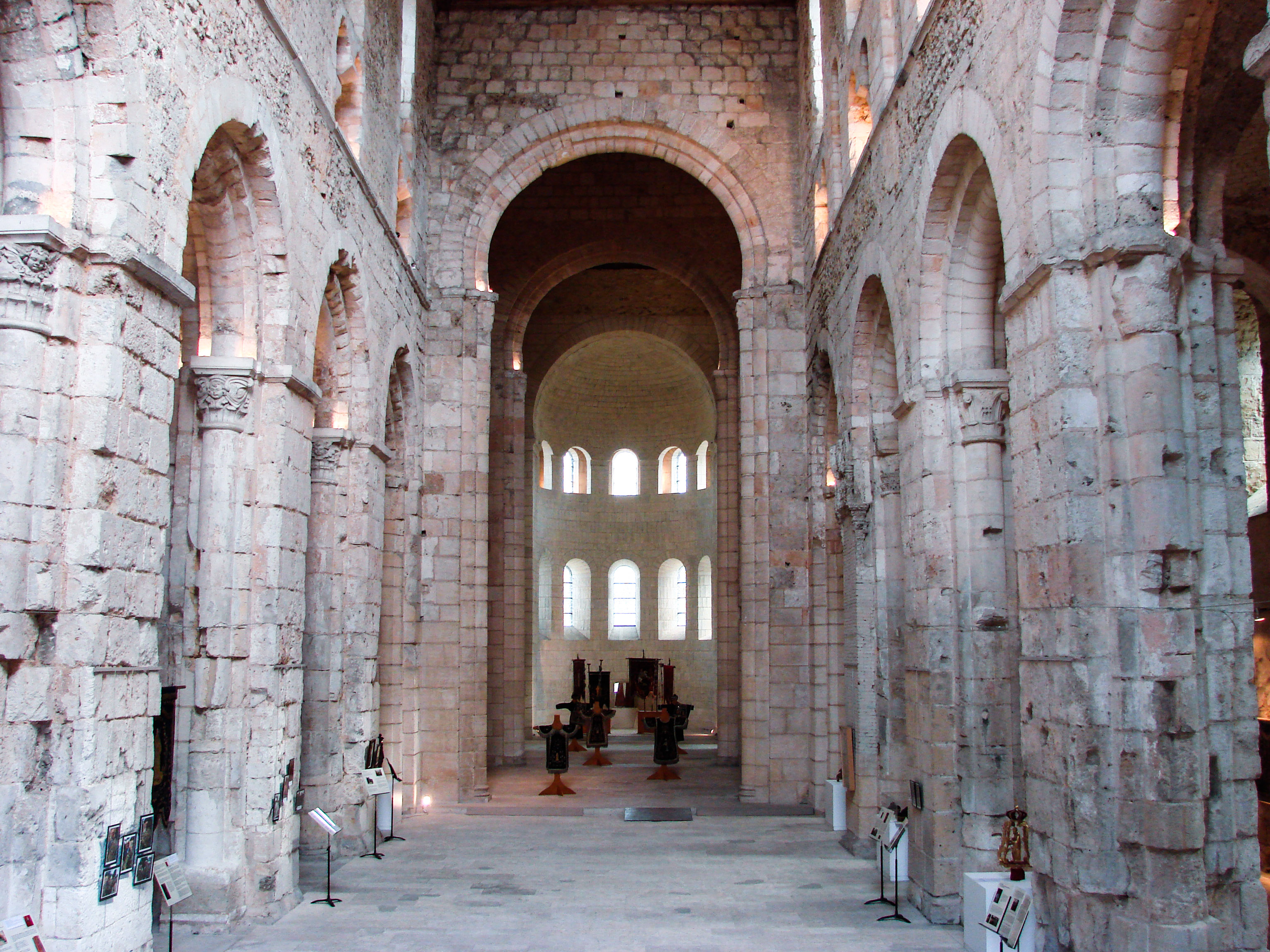
- Nave of the abbey church
- Interactive map of Bernay Abbey

Monastery information
- Order: Benedictine
- Established: 11th century
- Disestablished: 1790
- Dedication: Virgin Mary

People
- Founder: Judith of Brittany

Site
- Location: Bernay, Eure, France
- Coordinates: 49.0893°N 0.5982°E

Bernay Abbey (abbaye Notre-Dame de Bernay) was a Benedictine abbey in Bernay, Eure, France. The designers of its abbey church were ahead of their time, making it one of the first examples of Romanesque architecture in Normandy. It shows the early evolution of that style, its decorative elements and its building techniques.

Founded in the 11th century by Judith of Brittany, daughter of Conan I of Rennes and wife of Richard II, Duke of Normandy, the abbey church was listed as a historic monument in 1862, the other abbey buildings in 1965 and the archaeological remains on the site in 1999.

== History ==
When Judith married Richard II of Normany, she received a dowry of her father's lands in Cotentin, Cinglais and Lieuvin. Bernay or 'Bernayum' was the centre of these lands, comprising 13 'charruées' (around 800 acres) of land, 18 mills and 21 churches. Judith decided to devote Bernay to the foundation of a Benedictine monastery dedicated to the Virgin Mary.

Construction began in 1010, but Judith died in 1017 before work was completed. In 1025 Richard II had a charter witnessed by the young princes Richard and Robert (the future Richard III and Robert I), the bishops of the province and most of the nobility of Normandy - it granted the abbey a vast estate stretching from Giverville to Courtonne and from Cernières to Beaumont. He also made the new monastery a satellite of Fécamp Abbey, resumed construction and put the Italian architect and abbot Guillaume de Volpiano in charge of the building work.

For a long while the abbey remained a satellite of Fécamp, without its own abbot and dependent on "guardians" sent from the mother house. The first of these was Thierry, probably also abbot of the abbeys at Jumièges and Mont-Saint-Michel, who died on 17 May 1027. The next was Raoul de Vieilles, also abbot of Mont-Saint-Michel, who gave half the burgh of Bernay to Robert I of Montgommery, son of Roger de Montgomery, seigneur of Montgomery and favourite of Duke Robert I - the abbey never got these lands back. He also gave his uncle Onfroy de Vieilles important lands in Saint-Évroult and Beaumont-le-Roger previously owned by Bernay Abbey.

Vitalis of Creuilly became abbot around 1055. He had been a monk at Fécamp and thanks to him Bernay was granted autonomy and full abbey status. He was a confidant of John of Fécamp, who also gave him the task of Saint-Gabriel-Brécy Priory around 1058. Vitalis remained at Bernay until he was made abbot of Westminster Abbey in 1076 by William I of England after the Norman conquest of England - he died there in 1082. He carried out considerable building works at Bernay and the conquest also brought Bernay three priories in Suffolk and Northamptonshire. Vital was replaced by his brother Osbern.

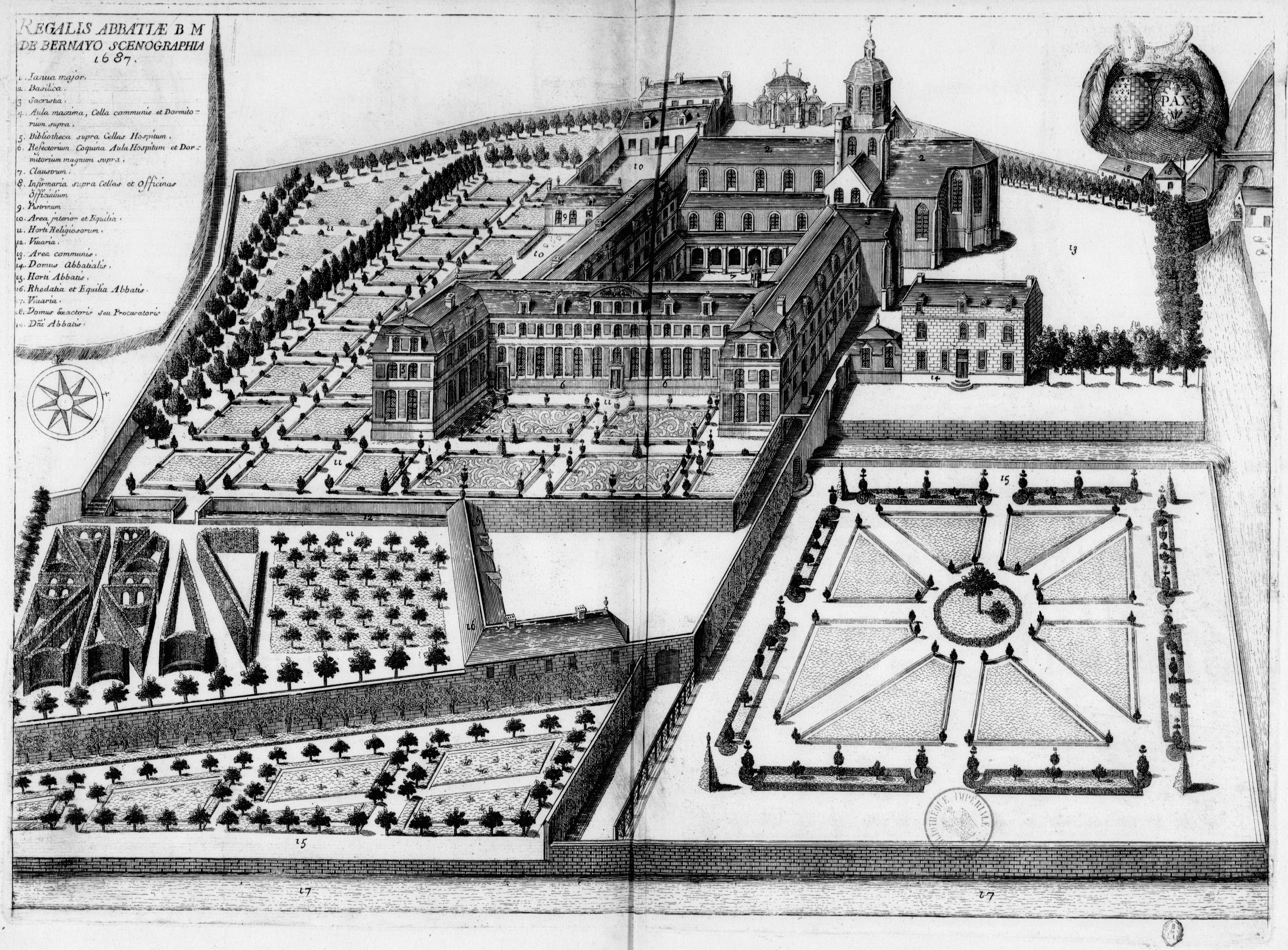
The abbey in 1687.

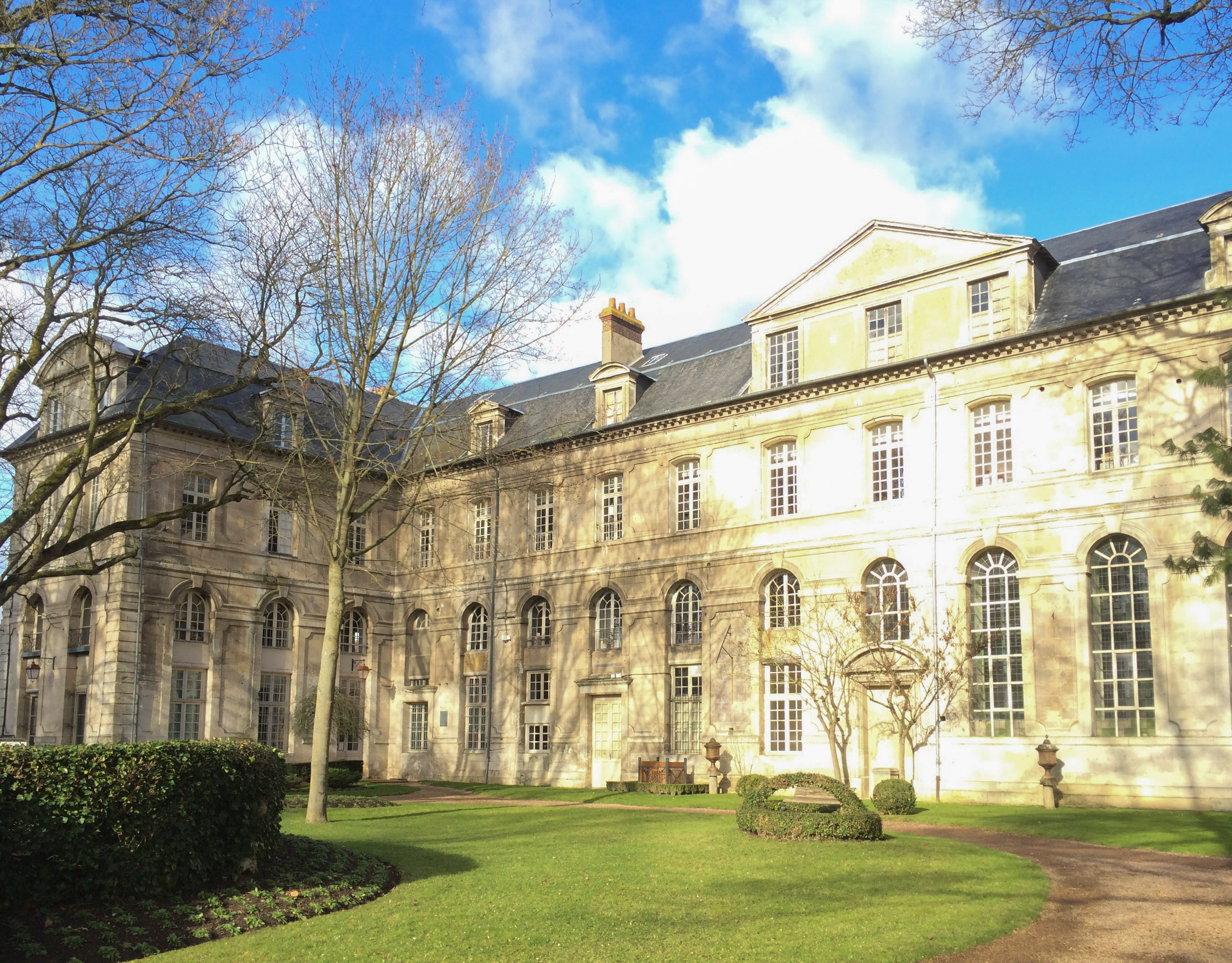
The Mauristes' buildings

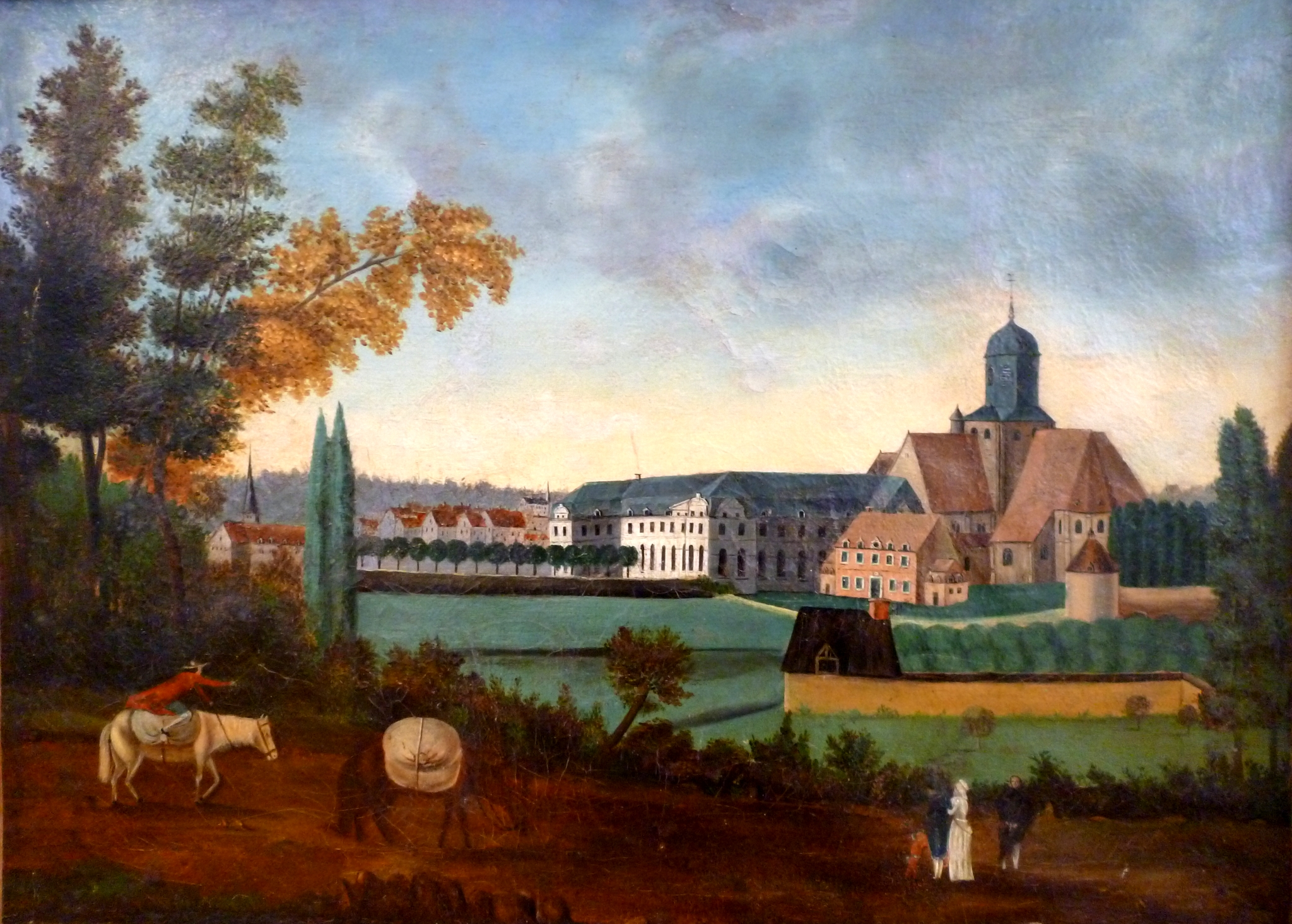
The abbey in 1785

The abbey archives are lost and so the next period of the abbey's history is unclear. The monks certainly profited from their town's prosperity after it became a textile and financial centre in the 12th century. In 1249 a major fire destroyed part of the monastery, reducing it from 35 to 15 monks. In the 15th century the abbey church's north nave aisle and apse were rebuilt in the Gothic style. In 1563, Gaspard II de Coligny sacked the abbey and looted its treasures and archives and it was further damaged by the rural Gauthier uprising in 1589. It was then left almost deserted until 1618, when the cloister was rebuilt. From 1628 it was taken on by the Mauristes, who began major building works in 1686. The refectory dates to 1694. The works also demolished the church's two westernmost bays and two eastern apse chapels. A new classical façade replaced the church's original one and most of the capitals in the nave were plastered in stucco. The central tower was also heavily reworked.

Only nine monks were left in the abbey by 1790, when it was suppressed. It was then re-used as a town hall, tribunal, prison and then as a Sous-Préfecture. The north transept disappeared in 1810 and four years later the abbey church became a wheat market before being subdivided between several different users. The apse was demolished in 1827 and the central tower was also razed at an unknown date. The abbey church was in a very bad state by 1963, when a restoration commenced by the town of Bernay and France's national 'Monuments historiques'. A very fine 12th century arch (probably from the chapter house) was uncovered and in 1965 the capitals of the south transept were rediscovered. Another restoration occurred in 1978, revealing the building's importance to the study of 11th century architecture.

== Abbey church ==
Built at a time when the duchy had not yet really discovered its way, the Bernay Abbey represents an almost isolated attempt, prepared by a single surviving precedent, the Saint-Pierre church of the Jumièges Abbey, as a little bit premature work of talented minds and evidence of innovative traits decisive for Norman architecture: the adoption of the stepped bedside, composite stacks and the passageway at the upper level of the transept arm. Most of the solutions of the architectural or decorative details appear without obvious ancestry and without obvious posterity, perhaps they were Burgundian imports, which were badly assimilated, but with a local rooting of traditions born at the end of the Merovingian period on the soil of the future Normandy, preserved and deepened under the Carolingians and having managed to survive the ravages of the Vikings.
