= Poets' Corner =

South Transept of Westminster Abbey

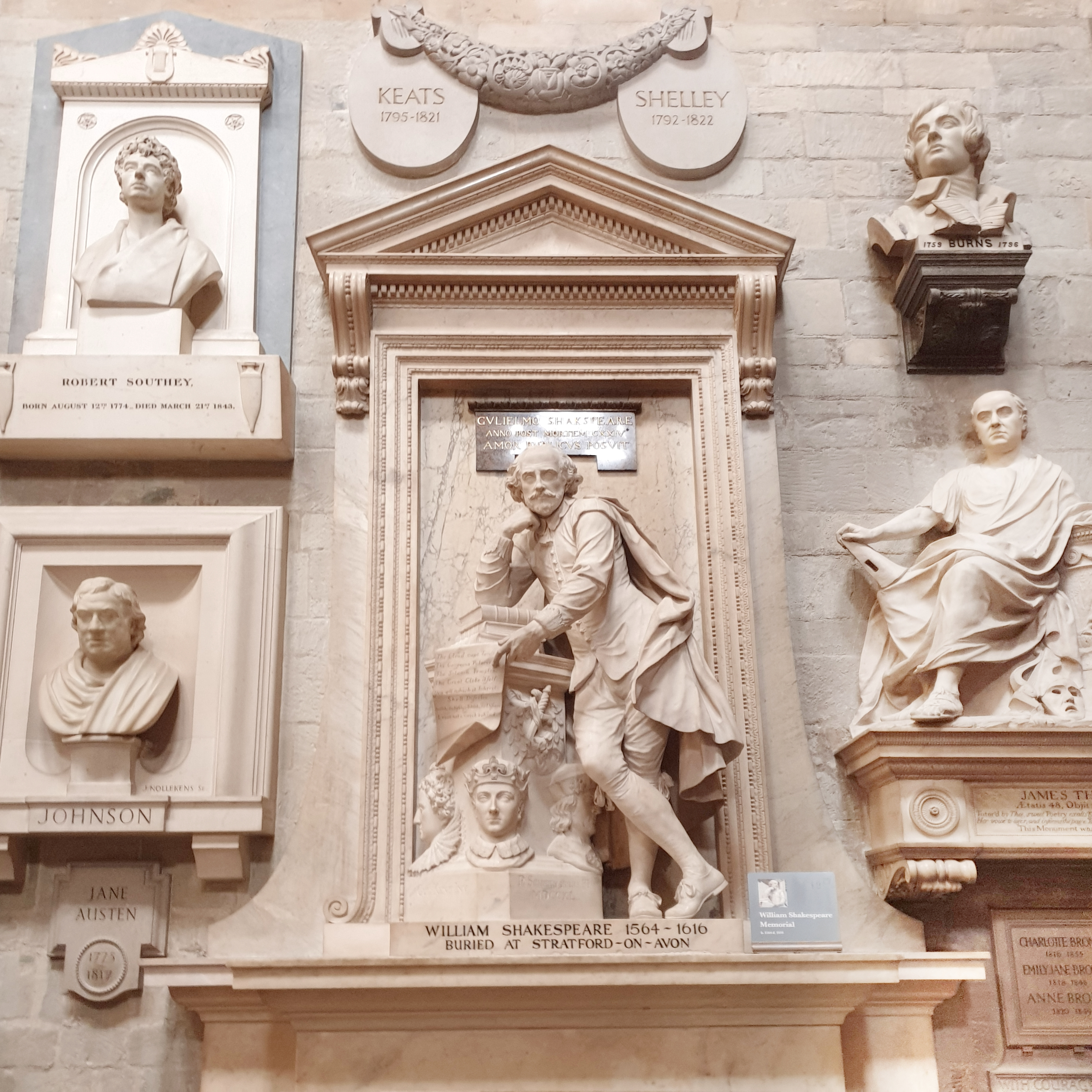
- Memorials in Poets' Corner
- Interactive map of Poets' Corner

Details
- Established: 1400
- Location: Westminster Abbey
- Country: City of Westminster, London, England
- Coordinates: 51°29′57″N 0°7′38.50″W

Poets' Corner is a section of the southern transept of Westminster Abbey in London, England, where many poets, playwrights, and writers are buried or commemorated.

The first poet interred in Poets' Corner was Geoffrey Chaucer in 1400. William Shakespeare was commemorated with a monument in 1740, over a century after his death. Over the centuries, a tradition has grown up of interring or memorialising people there in recognition of their contribution to British culture. In the overwhelming majority of cases, the honour is awarded to writers.

== History ==
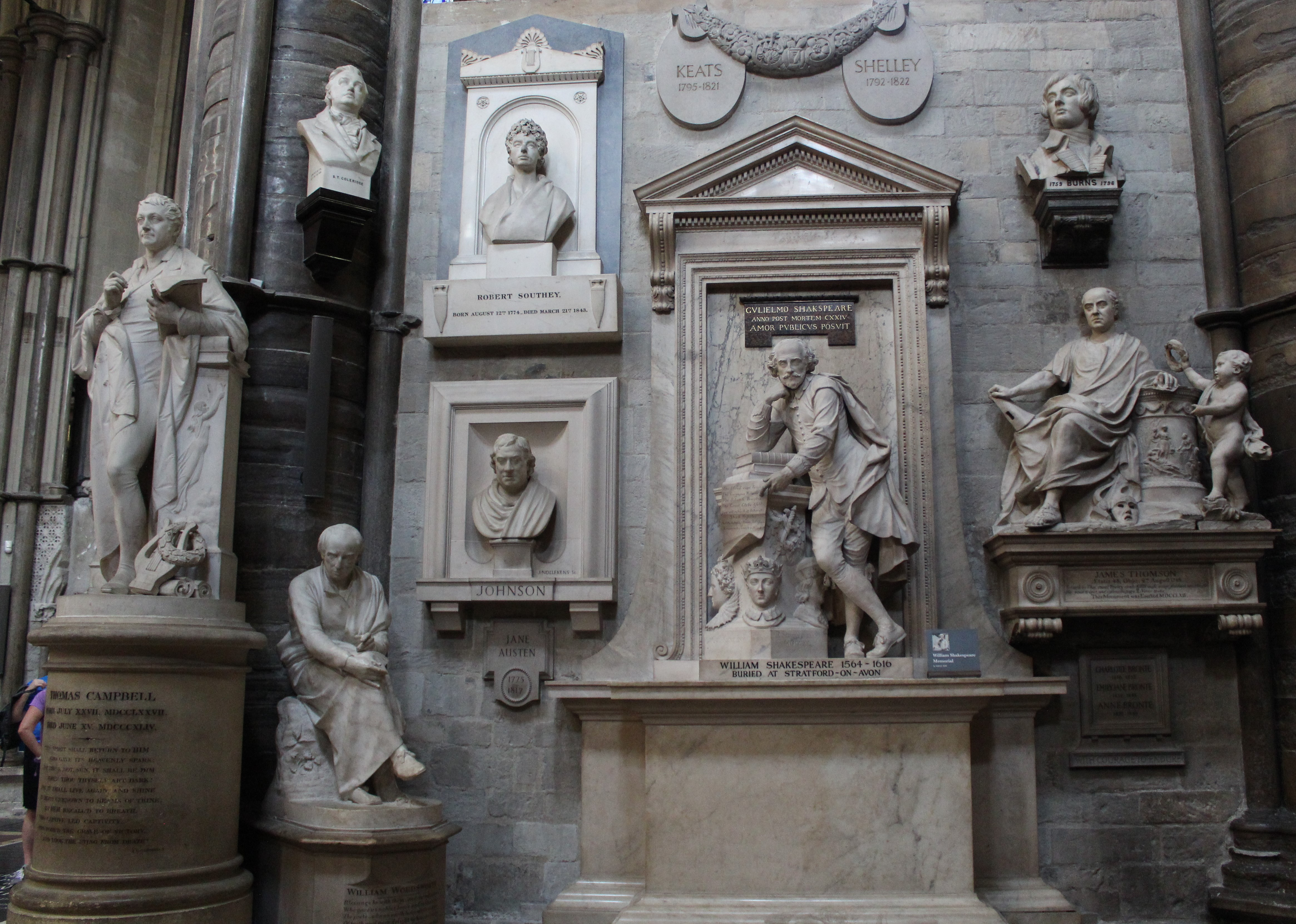
Partial view of Poets' Corner

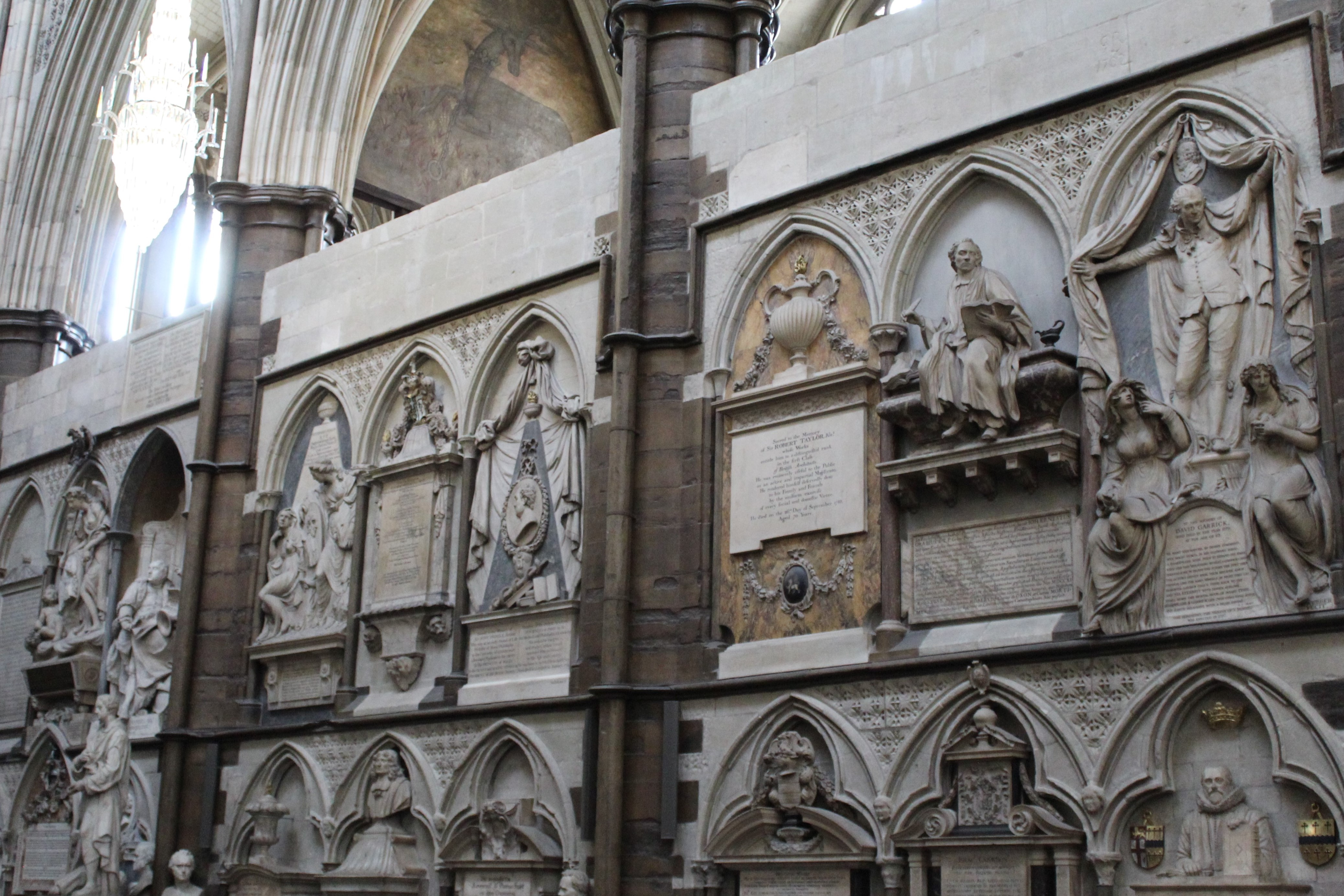
The west wall of Poets' Corner

The first poet interred in Poets' Corner, Geoffrey Chaucer, owed his 1400 burial in the Abbey (in front of St. Benedict's Chapel) more to his position as Clerk of Works of the Palace of Westminster than to his fame as a writer. The erection of his tomb by Nicholas Brigham in 1556 (to where Chaucer's remains were then transferred) and the nearby burial of Edmund Spenser in 1599 began a tradition that still continues. The area also houses the tombs of several Canons and Deans of the Abbey, as well as the grave of Thomas Parr who, it is said, died at the age of 152 in 1635 after having seen ten sovereigns on the throne.

Burial or commemoration in the Abbey does not always occur at or soon after the time of death. Lord Byron, for example, whose poetry was admired but who maintained a scandalous lifestyle, died in 1824 but was not given a memorial until 1969. Even William Shakespeare, buried at Stratford-upon-Avon in 1616, was not honoured with a monument until 1740 when one designed by William Kent was constructed in Poets' Corner (though shortly after Shakespeare's death William Basse had suggested Shakespeare should be buried there). Samuel Horsley, Dean of Westminster in 1796, was said to have tartly refused the request for the actress Kitty Clive to be buried in the Abbey:

if we do not draw some line in this theatrical ambition to mortuary fame, we shall soon make Westminster Abbey little better than a Gothic Green Room!

Not all poets appreciated memorialisation and Samuel Wesley's epitaph for Samuel Butler, who supposedly died in poverty, continued Butler's satiric tone:

While Butler, needy wretch, was yet alive,
No generous patron would a dinner give;
See him, when starv'd to death, and turn'd to dust,
Presented with a monumental bust.
The poet's fate is here in emblem shown,
He ask'd for bread, and he received a stone.

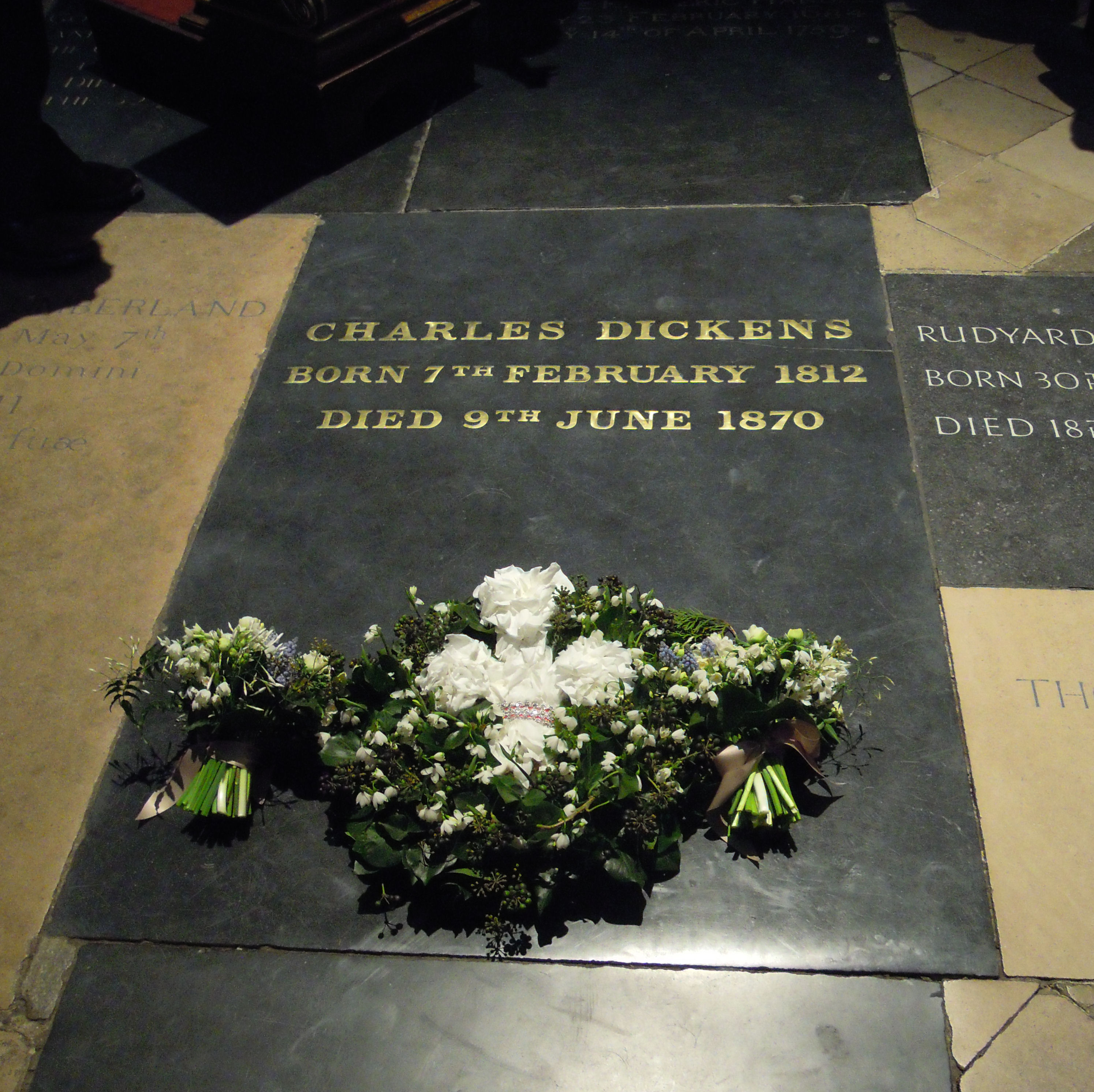
Grave of Charles Dickens

Some of those buried in Poets' Corner also had memorials erected to them over or near their grave, either around the time of their death or later. In some cases, such as Joseph Addison, the burial took place elsewhere in Westminster Abbey, with a memorial later erected in Poets' Corner. In some cases a full burial of a body took place, in other, later, cases the body was cremated and the ashes buried. There are also cases where there was support for a particular individual to be buried in Poets' Corner, but the decision was made to bury them elsewhere in the Abbey, such as Edward Bulwer-Lytton. Other notable poets and writers, such as Aphra Behn, are buried elsewhere in the Abbey. At least two of the memorials (both to individuals buried in Poets' Corner – Nicholas Rowe and John Gay) were later moved to a location elsewhere in the Abbey due to the discovery of old paintings on the wall behind them. In 1936 the ashes of the author and poet Rudyard Kipling were interred.

== Memorial types ==
The memorials can take several forms. Some are stone slabs set in the floor with a name and inscription carved on them, while others are more elaborate and carved stone monuments, or hanging stone tablets, or memorial busts. Some are commemorated in groups, such as the joint memorial for the Brontë sisters (commissioned in 1939, but not unveiled until 1947 due to the Second World War), the sixteen First World War poets inscribed on a stone floor slab and unveiled in 1985, and the four founders of the Royal Ballet, commemorated together in 2009.

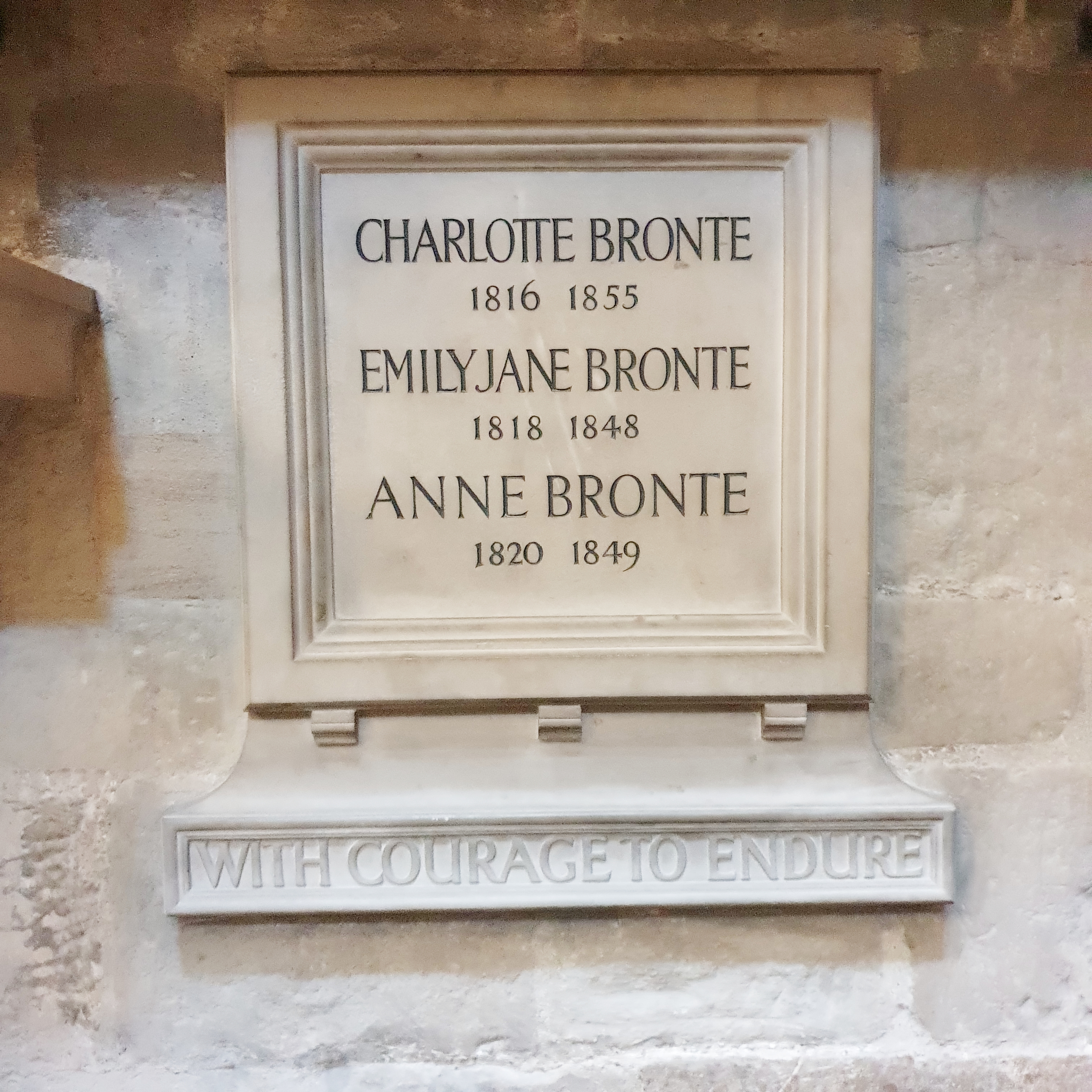
Brontë sisters wall tablet

The grave of Ben Jonson is not in Poets' Corner, but is in the north aisle of the nave. It has the inscription "O Rare Ben Jonson" (perhaps the original spelling) on the slab above it. It has been suggested that this could be read "Orare Ben Jonson" (pray for Ben Jonson), which would indicate a deathbed return to Catholicism, but the carving shows a distinct space between "O" and "rare". The fact that he was buried in an upright grave could be an indication of his reduced circumstances at the time of his death but it has also been suggested that Jonson asked for a grave exactly 18 inches square from the monarch and received an upright grave to fit in the requested space. As well as the gravestone in the north aisle of the nave, a wall tablet commemorating Jonson was later erected in Poets' Corner.

As floor and wall space began to run out, the decision was taken to install a stained glass memorial window (unveiled in 1994 in memory of Edward Horton Hubbard), and it is here that new names are added in the form of inscribed panes of glass. There is room for 20 names, and currently there are six names on this window, with the latest entry (Elizabeth Gaskell) unveiled on 25 September 2010. The memorial ceremonies often include guest speakers. In 1995, Oscar Wilde was commemorated in the window and those in attendance included Sir John Gielgud and Dame Judi Dench who both read extracts from his work.

== Burials ==
Image	Name	Born	Died	Age at death	Details of funeral / memorial	Occupation
	Robert Adam	1729	1792	63	Grave & gravestone	Architect
	Isaac Barrow	1630	1677	46	Grave & marble memorial bust on a pedestal by John Bushnell	Mathematician
	Francis Beaumont	1584	1616	31–32	Grave is unmarked. Name is inscribed on the Abraham Cowley gravestone.	Playwright
...	John Beaumont	1583	1627	43–44	Unmarked grave	Poet
...	William Benson	unknown	1549	unknown	Grave & memorial stone	Abbot of Westminster
Mary Eleanor Bowes and her husband John Lyon.	Mary Eleanor Bowes	1749	1800	51	Grave & gravestone. Reported by some to have been buried in a court dress, with all the accessories necessary for a Royal audience, plus a small silver trumpet, and by others as in her bridal dress.	Poet and playwright
	Robert Browning	1812	1889	77	Browning's grave & gravestone is immediately adjacent to that of Alfred, Lord Tennyson	Poet and playwright
	Richard Busby	1606	1695	88–89	Busby is buried beneath the pavement of the Choir while his memorial, by the sculptor Francis Bird, is located in the South Transept.	Headmaster
	William Camden	1551	1623	72	Marble memorial bust with surround	Antiquarian and historian
	Thomas Campbell	1777	1844	66	Funeral 3 July 1844.; Statue by William Calder Marshall erected 1848	Poet
	Henry Francis Cary	1772	1844	72	Funeral 14 August 1844. Grave & gravestone in Poets' Corner	Author and translator
	Isaac Casaubon	1559	1614	55	Wall monument in black & white marble by sculptor Nicholas Stone	Classical scholar
	William Chambers	1723	1796	75	Grave & gravestone in South Transept	Architect
	Geoffrey Chaucer	c. 1343	1400	56–57	Actual grave site is now unmarked but his name is inscribed on the Cowley gravestone. A grey Purbeck marble memorial was erected in 1556.	Author and poet
	Abraham Cowley	1618	1667	48–49	White marble monument, of an urn on a pedestal, by John Bushnell Large black marble gravestone to which several further names have been added.	Poet
	Richard Cumberland	1732	1811	79	Grave & gravestone in South Transept	Playwright
	William Davenant	1606	1668	62	Grave & gravestone in South Transept	Poet and playwright
	John Denham	1614 or 1615	1669	63–65	Grave is unmarked. Name is inscribed on the Abraham Cowley gravestone.	Poet
	Charles Dickens	1812	1870	58	Dickens's will did not dictate his place of burial, but stipulated that there be no grand funeral ceremony. He was therefore given a secret early-morning funeral in the Abbey, 14 June 1870.	Author
	Michael Drayton	1563	1631	67–68	Died in London. Memorial bust & surround in alabaster & black marble placed by the Countess of Dorset, with lines attributed to Ben Jonson.	Poet
	John Dryden	1631	1700	68	Grave is unmarked. Name is inscribed on the Cowley gravestone. Memorial bust on pedestal by Peter Scheemakers was erected in 1731, replacing an earlier memorial.	Poet and playwright
...	Adam Fox	1888	1977	93–94	Grave & gravestone in South Transept	Oxford Professor of Poetry; Canon of Westminster Abbey
	David Garrick	1717	1779	61	Grave plus monument in white and grey marble by Henry Webber on the west wall of Poets' Corner	Actor
	John Gay	1685	1732	47	Buried in South Transept, with a monument by John Michael Rysbrack which is now in the Queen's Diamond Jubilee Galleries	Poet and playwright
	William Gifford	1756	1826	70	Gifford wanted to be buried in South Audley Chapel, "but for the pressing request of his grateful executor [John Ireland, Dean of Westminster], who was anxious that Gifford's remains should be mingled with the great and good in Poets' Corner, Westminster-abbey."	Poet and editor
	George Grote	1794	1871	76	Marble bust by Charles Bacon, 1873	Historian
	Richard Hakluyt	c.1552	1616	63–64	Unmarked grave thought to be in the South Transept	Author
	George Frideric Handel	1685	1759	74	Life-size sculpture by Louis-François Roubiliac with musical scores and instruments represented.	Composer
	Thomas Hardy	1840	1928	87	Hardy's funeral, on 16 January 1928, was controversial. Hardy had wanted to be buried at Stinsford in the grave of his first wife, Emma. His executor, Sir Sydney Carlyle Cockerell, was adamant that Hardy warranted interment in the Poets' Corner. A compromise saw his heart buried at Stinsford, and his ashes at the Abbey.	Author and poet
	John Henderson	1747	1785	38	Buried at the foot of the grave of David Garrick in the south transept. The inscription has now worn away but it read: "Underneath this stone are interr'd the remains of John Henderson who died the 25th day of November. 1785 aged 38 years".	Actor
	Henry Irving	1838	1905	67	Grave & gravestone	Actor
	Samuel Johnson	1709	1784	75	Bust by Joseph Nollekens located above Johnson's grave	Author, poet and lexicographer
	Rudyard Kipling	1865	1936	70	Grave & gravestone	Author and poet
...	Nicholas Litlyngton	before 1315	1386	70+	Grave & memorial stone	Abbot of Westminster
	Thomas Macaulay	1800	1859	59	Public funeral, 9 January 1860, with a bust by the sculptor George Burnard erected in 1866.	Poet and historian
	James Macpherson	1736	1796	59	Grave & gravestone	Author and poet
	John Masefield	1878	1967	88	According to his wishes, was cremated and his ashes placed in Poets' Corner.	Poet and author
...	Robert Moray	1608/9	1673	63–65	Grave is unmarked. Name is inscribed on the Cowley gravestone.	Statesman and natural philosopher
	Gilbert Murray	1866	1957	91	Grave & gravestone	Scholar and translator
	Laurence, Lord Olivier	1907	1989	82	Grave & memorial stone	Actor
	Old Tom Parr	1483	1635	152	Grave & gravestone	Supposedly long-lived Englishman
	Matthew Prior	1664	1721	57	Grave is unmarked. Name is inscribed on the Cowley gravestone. Memorial, designed by James Gibbs, with a bust by Antoine Coysevox and figures by John Michael Rysbrack erected by 1726.	Poet and diplomat
	Nicholas Rowe	1674	1718	44	Buried in South Transept, with a monument by John Michael Rysbrack which is now in the Queen's Diamond Jubilee Galleries	Playwright and poet
	Charles de Saint-Évremond	1610	1703	93	Grave is unmarked. Name is inscribed on the Cowley gravestone. Memorial was also erected.	Essayist and literary critic
	Richard Brinsley Sheridan	1751	1816	64	Grave & gravestone	Playwright and poet
	Robert South	1634	1716	81	Monument by Francis Bird	Theologian and poet
	Edmund Spenser	c. 1552	1599	46–47	Marble memorial erected in 1620 on south wall of Poets' Corner, fully restored 1778	Poet
...	Robert Stapylton	c.1607	1669	61–62	Unmarked grave in the South Transept	Playwright
...	Mary Steele	1678	1718	40	Grave and gravestone in South Transept	Letter writer
	Alfred, Lord Tennyson	1809	1892	83	Large public funeral, 12 October 1892. In 1893 the government formally requested there be a bust of Tennyson in Poets' Corner. The businessman-botanist Charles Jenner offered Thomas Woolner's 1857 bust of Tennyson to the Abbey, and it was placed near Tennyson's gravestone, by moving a tablet to Christopher Anstey, in 1895. There was no formal unveiling ceremony.	Poet
	Connop Thirlwall	1797	1875	78	Marble bust by sculptor Edward Davis	Bishop and historian
	Thomas Triplett	1602	1670	68	Marble memorial on west wall of South Transept	Prebendary
	Eva Marie Veigel	1724	1822	98	Buried with her husband David Garrick	Dancer

== Memorials ==
Image	Name	Born	Died	Age at death	Year commemorated	Details of memorial	Occupation
	Joseph Addison	1672	1719	47	1809	Statue by Richard Westmacott. Addison is buried elsewhere in the Abbey.	Poet and essayist
	Christopher Anstey	1724	1805	80	1807	Marble wall tablet	Poet and author
	Matthew Arnold	1822	1888	65	1989	Memorial bust of 1891 in the east aisle of Poets' Corner by Albert Bruce-Joy. There is also a 1989 limestone and slate plaque honouring Arnold, by Donald Buttress, in Poets' Corner.	Poet
	Peggy Ashcroft	1907	1991	83	2005	Floor stone	Actress
	W. H. Auden	1907	1973	66	1974	Floor stone	Poet
	Jane Austen	1775	1817	41	1967	Wall tablet	Author
	John Betjeman	1906	1984	77	1996	Marble wall tablet	Poet and author
	William Blake	1757	1827	69	1957	Bronze memorial bust by Jacob Epstein, 1957	Poet and artist
...	Barton Booth	1681	1733	51–52	1772	Monument	Actor
	Charlotte Brontë	1816	1855	38	1947	Memorial tablet	Author
	Anne Brontë	1820	1849	29	1947	Memorial tablet	Author
	Emily Brontë	1818	1848	30	1947	Memorial tablet	Author
	Elizabeth Barrett Browning	1806	1861	55	1906	Inscription added to Robert Browning's gravestone in 1906	Poet
	Fanny Burney	1752	1840	87	2002	Panel on Hubbard memorial window	Author and playwright
	Robert Burns	1759	1796	37	1885	Marble memorial bust by John Steell. Unveiled 7 March 1885 by the Earl of Rosebery.	Poet
	Samuel Butler	1612	1680	68	1721	Memorial bust thought to be by John Michael Rysbrack; Butler is buried at St Paul's, Covent Garden.	Poet
	George, Lord Byron	1788	1824	36	1969	Floor stone	Poet
	Cædmon	fl.657	fl.680	unknown	1966	Floor stone	Poet
	John Campbell, 2nd Duke of Argyll	1678	1743	64	1749	Monument by Louis-Francois Roubiliac, erected 1749, with figures representing History, Eloquence and Minerva. The Duke is buried elsewhere in the Abbey.	Soldier and nobleman
	Lewis Carroll	1832	1898	65	1982	Floor stone	Author
	John Clare	1793	1864	70	1989	Floor stone	Poet
	Samuel Taylor Coleridge	1772	1834	61	1885	Memorial bust by Hamo Thornycroft	Poet
	George Eliot	1819	1880	61	1980	Floor stone	Author
	T. S. Eliot	1888	1965	76	1967	Floor stone	Poet and playwright
	David Frost	1939	2013	74	2014	Floor stone	Journalist, comedian, writer and media personality
	Elizabeth Gaskell	1810	1865	55	2010	Panel on Hubbard memorial window	Novelist
	John Gielgud	1904	2000	96	2022	Floor stone	Actor and director
	Oliver Goldsmith	1728	1774	45	1776	Memorial tablet and bust	Poet and playwright
	Adam Lindsay Gordon	1833	1870	36	1934	Memorial bust by Kathleen Scott	Poet
	John Ernest Grabe	1666	1711	44–45	1727	Monument by Francis Bird on the west wall of Poets' Corner erected 1726	Priest and theologian
	Thomas Gray	1716	1771	54	1778	Monument	Poet and historian
	Stephen Hales	1677	1761	83	1761	Monument	Priest and scientist
	Robert Herrick	1591	1674	83	1994	Panel on Hubbard memorial window	Poet
	Gerard Manley Hopkins	1844	1889	44	1975	Floor stone	Poet
	A. E. Housman	1859	1936	77	1996	Panel on Hubbard memorial window	Poet
	Ted Hughes	1930	1998	68	2011	Floor stone at the foot of that for T. S. Eliot, one of his main influences	Poet
	Henry James	1843	1916	72	1976	Floor stone	Author
	Ben Jonson	1572	1637	65	1723	Memorial with portrait medallion and masks designed by James Gibbs and carved by John Michael Rysbrack.	Playwright and poet
	John Keats	1795	1821	25	1954	Mural tablet	Poet
	John Keble	1792	1866	73	1873	Bust by Thomas Woolner	Poet
	Charles Kingsley	1819	1875	55	1875	Bust by Thomas Woolner	Author
	Philip Larkin	1922	1985	63	2016	Floor stone. The stone was inscribed with the final two lines from "An Arundel Tomb": Our almost-instinct almost true: What will survive of us is love.	Poet and novelist
	D. H. Lawrence	1885	1930	44	1985	Floor stone	Author and poet
	Edward Lear	1812	1888	75	1988	Floor stone	Author and poet
	C. S. Lewis	1898	1963	64	2013	Floor stone. The dedication service, at noon on 22 November 2013, included a reading from The Last Battle by Douglas Gresham, younger stepson of Lewis. Flowers were laid by Walter Hooper, trustee and literary advisor to the Lewis Estate. An address was delivered by former Archbishop of Canterbury Rowan Williams. The floor stone inscription is a quotation from an address by Lewis: "I believe in Christianity as I believe that the Sun has risen, not only because I see it but because by it I see everything else."	Author
	Jenny Lind	1820	1887	67	1894	Wall tablet. "A medallion portrait of the famous singer – the last work of the late Mr Birch – has been placed in Poets' Corner, Westminster Abbey, and was yesterday unveiled by the Princess Christian."	Opera singer
	Henry Wadsworth Longfellow	1807	1882	75	1884	Marble bust by Thomas Brock, unveiled 1 March 1884.	Poet
	F. W. Maitland	1850	1906	56	2001	Floor stone	Historian
	Christopher Marlowe (disputed portrait)	1564	1593	29	2002	Panel on Hubbard memorial window	Playwright and poet
	William Mason	1724	1797	72–73	1799	Memorial, by John Bacon, in the east aisle of Poets' Corner	Poet
	F. D. Maurice	1805	1872	66	1932	Bust in east aisle of Poets' Corner by Thomas Woolner	Author
...	Thomas May	1595	1650	54–56	1880	Wall stone	Poet and playwright
	John Milton	1608	1674	65	1737	Monument with bust by John Michael Rysbrack	Poet and author
	John Philips	1676	1709	32	1710	Monument	Poet
	Alexander Pope	1688	1744	56	1994	Panel on Hubbard memorial window	Poet
	John Pringle	1707	1782	74	...	Monument	Military physician
	Hannah Pritchard	1711	1768	56–57	...	Monument. Later moved to the triforium.	Actress
	John Ruskin	1819	1900	80	1902	Portrait roundel in bronze by Edward Onslow Ford. Unveiled 8 February 1902, after a controversy over whether Ruskin felt monuments like this wasted money and disfigured a building's architectural unity.	Poet and art critic
	Walter Scott	1771	1832	61	1897	Bust by the Scottish sculptor John Hutchison, "a beautifully executed copy of the famous Chantrey bust at Abbotsford".	Author and poet
	Thomas Shadwell	c.1642	1692	~50	c.1700	Monument	Poet and playwright
	William Shakespeare	1564	1616	52	1740	Statue with surround designed by William Kent and carved by Peter Scheemakers	Playwright and poet
	Granville Sharp	1735	1813	77	1816	Monument	Slavery abolitionist
	Percy Bysshe Shelley	1792	1822	29	1954	Mural tablet	Poet
	Robert Southey	1774	1843	68	1845	Marble memorial bust with surround by Henry Weekes	Poet
	William Makepeace Thackeray	1811	1863	52	1865	Marble bust by Carlo Marochetti	Author
	James Thomson	1700	1748	47	1762	Sculpture group designed by Robert Adam and carved by Michael Spring	Poet and playwright
	Dylan Thomas	1914	1953	39	1982	Floor stone	Poet and author
	Anthony Trollope	1815	1882	67	1993	Floor stone	Author
	William Vincent	1739	1815	76	c.1815 1	Monument	Dean of Westminster
	Oscar Wilde	1854	1900	46	1995	Panel on Hubbard memorial window	Playwright and author
	William Wordsworth	1770	1850	80	1854	Statue by Frederick Thrupp erected 1854.	Poet
	James Wyatt	1746	1813	67	...	Monument	Architect

== First World War poets ==
The memorial in Poets' Corner, Westminster Abbey, to 16 Great War poets is a slate stone slab with the names of the poets inscribed on it. It was unveiled on 11 November 1985, the 67th anniversary of the Armistice. An additional inscription quotes Owen's "Preface":

My subject is War, and the pity of War. The Poetry is in the pity.

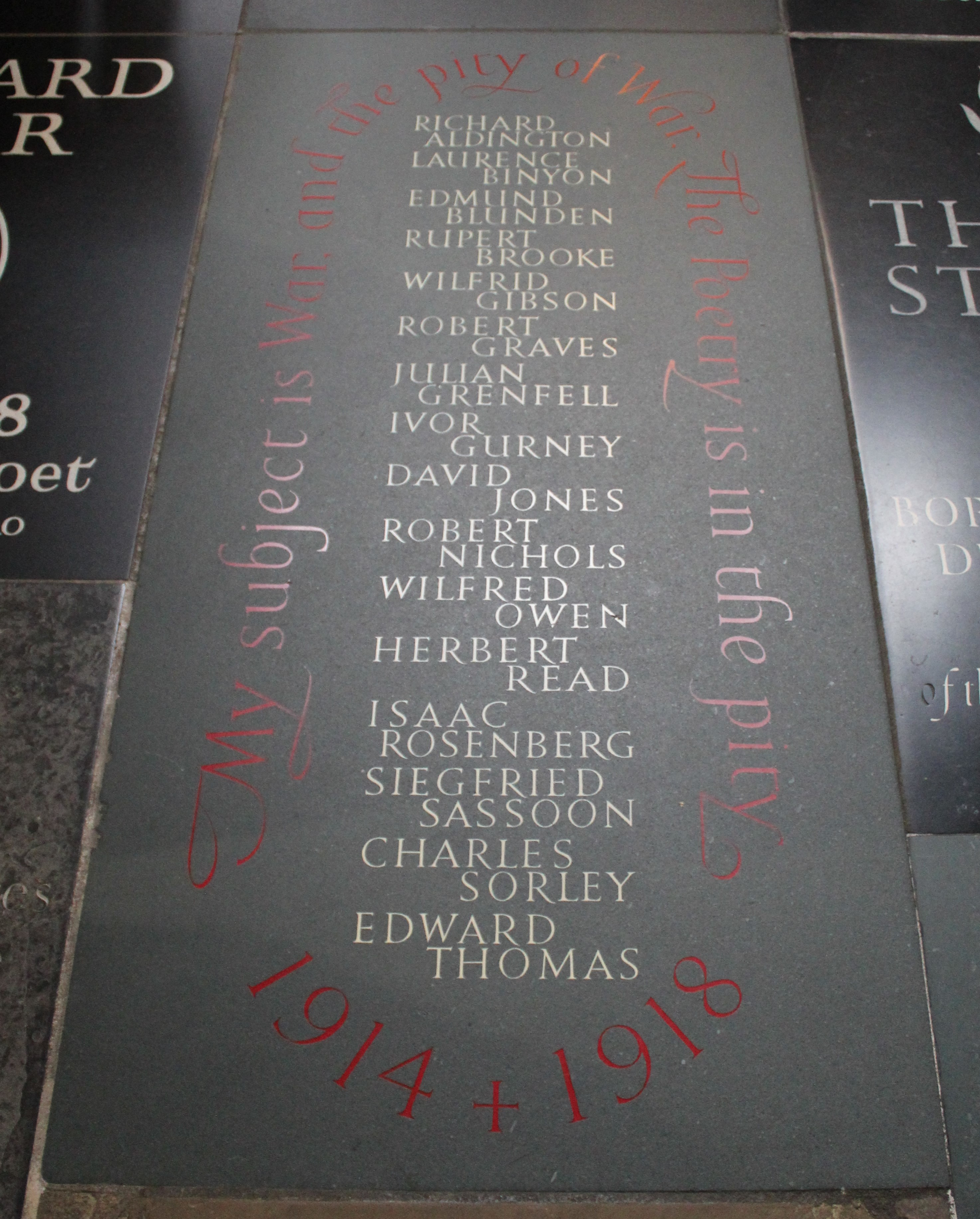
Poets of the First World War memorial

Image	Poet	Born	Died	Age when war started	Notes on war service	Notes on poetry
...	Richard Aldington	1892	1962	22	Enlisted 1916; Commissioned 1917; Second Lieutenant; Royal Sussex Regiment	...
	Laurence Binyon	1869	1943	44	Volunteered in 1915 and 1916; Hôpital Temporaire d'Arc-en-Barrois; British hospital for French soldiers	...
	Edmund Blunden	1896	1974	17	Commissioned August 1915; Second Lieutenant; Royal Sussex Regiment	...
	Rupert Brooke ^{†}	1887	1915	27	Commissioned August 1914; Temporary Sub-Lieutenant; Royal Naval Volunteer Reserve	...
...	Wilfrid Gibson	1878	1962	35	Rejected several times Enlisted October 1917; Army Service Corps (Motor Transport); Never saw active service	...
...	Robert Graves	1895	1985	19	Commissioned 1914; Royal Welch Fusiliers	...
	Julian Grenfell ^{†}	1888	1915	26	Commissioned 1910; Captain (at time of death); Royal Dragoons	...
...	Ivor Gurney	1890	1937	23	Private; Gloucestershire Regiment	...
	David Jones	1895	1974	18	Enlisted 1915; Private; Royal Welch Fusiliers	...
	Robert Nichols	1893	1944	20	Commissioned 1914; Royal Artillery	...
	Wilfred Owen ^{†}	1893	1918	21	Enlisted 1915; Commissioned June 1916; Second Lieutenant; Manchester Regiment	...
	Herbert Read	1893	1968	20	Captain; Green Howards	...
	Isaac Rosenberg ^{†}	1890	1918	23	Enlisted October 1915; 12th Suffolk Regiment; King's Own Royal Lancaster	...
	Siegfried Sassoon	1886	1967	27	Enlisted 1914; Commissioned May 1915; Captain (at end of war); Royal Welch Fusiliers	...
	Charles Sorley ^{†}	1895	1915	19	Enlisted 1914; Captain (at time of death); Suffolk Regiment	...
	Edward Thomas ^{†}	1878	1917	36	Enlisted July 1915; Artists Rifles; Commissioned November 1916; Royal Garrison Artillery	...

The ^{†} symbol indicates poets who died during the war.

== Royal Ballet ==
The stone slab floor memorial to the four founders of the Royal Ballet was dedicated on 17 November 2009.

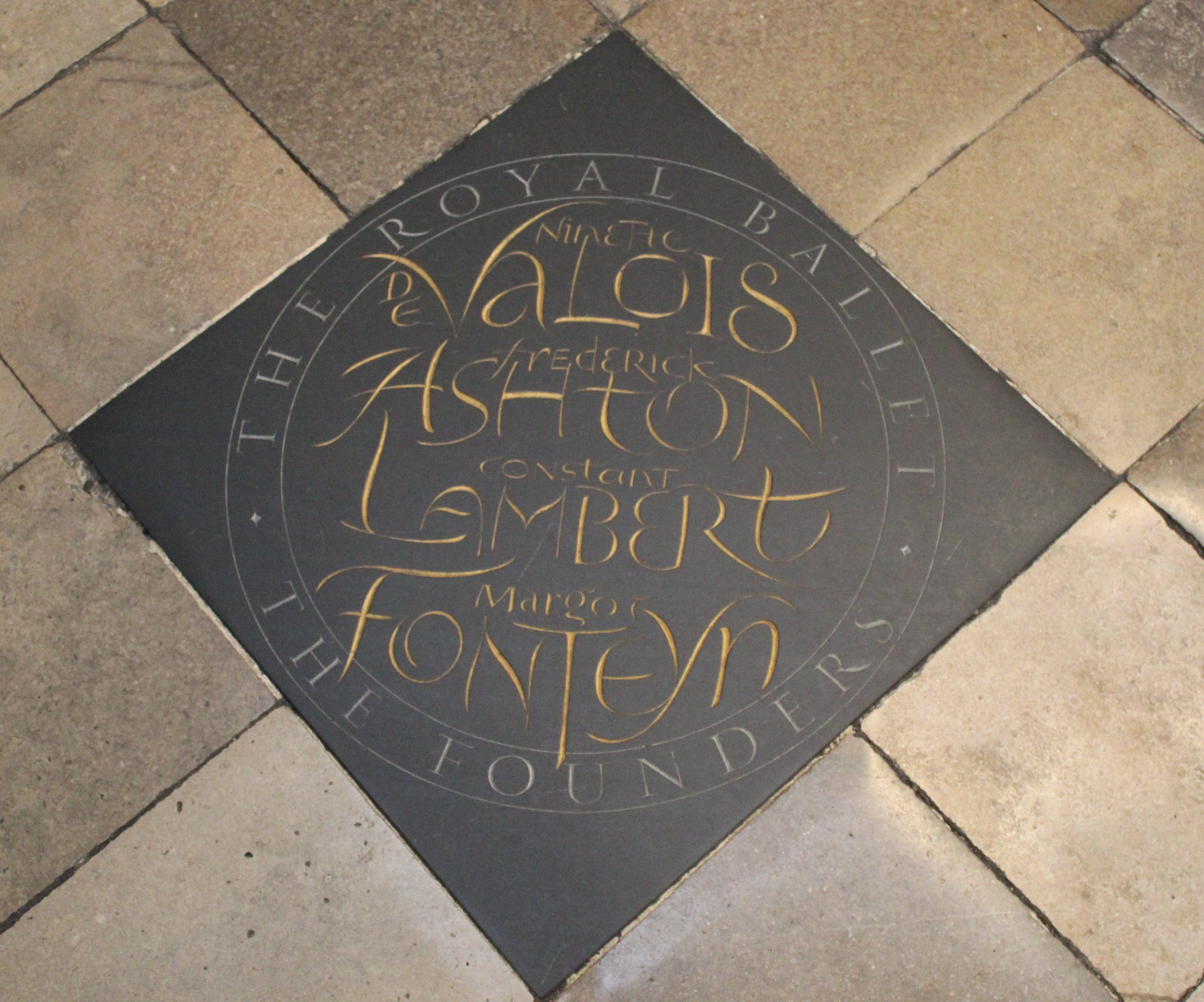
Founders of the Royal Ballet floor stone

Image	Name	Born	Died	Age at death	Notes on Royal Ballet role
	Ninette de Valois	1898	2001	102	...
...	Frederick Ashton	1904	1988	84	...
	Constant Lambert	1905	1951	45	...
	Margot Fonteyn	1919	1991	71	...

== Elsewhere in the Abbey ==
Poets and writers commemorated elsewhere in Westminster Abbey, but not in Poets' Corner proper.

Image	Name	Born	Died	Age at death	Year commemorated	Details of memorial	Notes on artistic career
	Robert Ayton	1570	1638	67–68		Bronze bust with figures of Apollo and Athene in south anbulatory	Poet
	Aphra Behn	1640	1689	48		Gravestone	Author and playwright
	Edward Bulwer-Lytton	1803	1873	69		Gravestone	Author and poet
	John Bunyan	1628	1688	59	1912	Memorial window	Author
	Margaret Cavendish, Duchess of Newcastle-upon-Tyne	1623	1673	69–70		Monument	Author and poet
	William Cavendish, 1st Duke of Newcastle-upon-Tyne	1592	1676	84		Monument	Playwright and poet
	William Congreve	1670	1729	58	c.1730	Monument	Playwright and poet
	Noël Coward	1899	1973	73	1984	Floor stone	Playwright and composer
	William Cowper	1731	1800	68	1876	Memorial window	Poet and hymnodist
	Wentworth Dillon, 4th Earl of Roscommon	1637	1685	47–48		Grave not marked	Poet
	Benjamin Disraeli, 1st Earl of Beaconsfield	1804	1881	76	1884	Statue by Joseph Boehm	Author and politician
	George Herbert	1593	1633	39	1876	Memorial window	Poet and orator
	Robert Howard	1626	1698	72			Playwright
	James R. Lowell	1819	1891	72		Tablet and window	Poet
	Anne Oldfield	1683	1730	47		Gravestone	Actress
	Henry Spelman	c.1564	1641	76–77		Gravestone	Antiquarian
	Arthur P. Stanley	1815	1881	65	1884	Tomb and effigy	Author
	Sybil Thorndike	1882	1976	93		Gravestone	Actress
	Ralph Vaughan Williams	1872	1958	86	1958	Floor stone	Composer
	Isaac Watts	1674	1748	74	1779	Monument	Hymnodist
	P. G. Wodehouse	1881	1975	93	2019	Stone plaque designed by Stephen Raw and carved by Annet Stirling, unveiled in the south choir aisle in 2019	Humourist, novelist, lyricist, playwright

== In literature ==
Poets' Corner is also the title of a play by James Huntrods, and The Poets' Corner was a book of caricatures of famous poets by Max Beerbohm published in 1904.
