= John Islip =

English abbot (1464-1532)

- Title: Abbot of Westminster

Personal life
- Born: 1464
- Died: 1532 (aged 67–68)

Religious life
- Religion: Roman Catholicism

Senior posting
- Based in: England
- Period in office: 1500–1532
- Predecessor: George Fascet
- Successor: William Boston
- Previous post: Prior of Westminster Abbey

John Islip (1464–1532) was abbot of the monastery of Westminster, London, in Tudor times.

== Biography ==
Islip was doubtless a member of the family which rose to ecclesiastical importance in the person of Archbishop Simon Islip. John entered the monastery of Westminster about 1480, and showed his administrative capacity in minor offices, till in 1498 he was elected prior, and on 27 October 1500 abbot of Westminster. The first business which he undertook was to claim for the abbey of Westminster the possession of the body of Henry VI, for whose canonisation Henry VII was pressing at Rome. The claim was disputed by Windsor and Chertsey Abbey, and the question was argued before the privy council, which decided in favour of Westminster. Henry VI's remains were removed from Windsor at a cost of £500. Islip had next to advise Henry VII in his plan for removing the old lady chapel of the abbey church and the erection instead of the chapel which still bears Henry VII's name. The old building was pulled down, and on 24 January 1503 Islip laid the foundation-stone of the new structure. The indentures between the king and Abbot Islip relating to the foundation of Henry VII's chantry and the regulation of its services are in the Harleian MS. 1498. They are splendidly engrossed, and have two initial letters which represent the king giving the document to Islip and the monks who kneel before him. The face of Islip is so strongly marked that it seems to be a real portrait.

Islip seems to have discharged carefully the duties of his office. In 1511 he held a visitation of the dependent priory of Malvern, and repeated it in 1516, when he suspended the prior. His capacity for business led Henry VIII to appoint him a member of the privy council, probably on his departure to France in 1513, as Islip's name first appears attached to a letter in September of that year. Islip was further one of the triers of petitions to parliament, and was on the commission of the peace for Middlesex. Still Islip's dignified position did not protect him from the authority of Wolsey, who showed his determination to use his legatine power by a severe visitation of Westminster in 1518; and again in 1525, when the monastery had to pay a hundred marks for the expenses of the visitation. In the same year we find Islip acting as Wolsey's commissioner in the affairs of the monastery of Glastonbury. In 1527 Islip, as president of the English Benedictines, issued a commission to the Abbot of Gloucester for the visitation of the abbey of Malmesbury, where there had been a rebellion of the monks against their abbot.

This peaceful discharge of ordinary duties was disturbed for Islip, as for most other Englishmen of high position, by the proceedings for the king's divorce. In July 1529 Islip was joined with Burbank and others for the purpose of searching among the royal papers for documents to present to the legatine court of Wolsey and Campeggio. In 1530 Islip was one of those who signed a letter to the pope in favour of the king's divorce, and in July 1531 Henry VIII suggested to the pope that Islip, whom he calls 'a good old father', should be joined as an assessor to Archbishop Warham for the purpose of trying the cause in England. But though Henry was bent upon his divorce, he could attend to minor matters; for in September 1531 he negotiated an exchange with the abbey of Westminster of sundry tenements reaching as far as Charing Cross, for which he gave them the site of the convent of Poghley, Berkshire, one of the lesser monasteries, dissolved by Wolsey, which had become forfeited to the crown. Islip died peaceably on 12 May 1532, and was buried in the abbey with extraordinary splendour.

Islip's career was entirely representative of the life of a great churchman of the time in other points than those already mentioned. In 1526 he was one of those commissioned by Wolsey to search for heretics among the Hanseatic merchants in London, and often sat in the consistory court of London to judge English heretics. But the chief reason why Islip's name is remembered is his buildings at Westminster Abbey. He raised the western tower as far as the level of the roof, repaired much of the church, especially the buttresses, filled the niches with statues, and designed a central tower, which he did not proceed with because he found the pillars too weak to bear the weight. He built many apartments in the abbot's house, and a gallery overlooking the nave on the south side. Moreover, he built for himself the little mortuary chapel which still bears his name, and is adorned by his rebus, a boy falling from a tree, with the legend 'I slip.' The paintings in the chapel have disappeared, and only the table of his tomb remains. Islip's fame as a custodian of the fabric of the abbey long remained, and his example was held as a model by Williams when he was dean of Westminster.

He is commemorated in John Islip Street, Westminster.
