= Sulcard =

Sulcard (floruit c. 1080) was a Benedictine monk at St. Peter's, Westminster Abbey, and the author of the first history of the abbey.

Little is known of Sulcard, whose unusual name may reflect either Anglo-Saxon or Norman parentage. His entrance into the monastery may be dated to the 1050s and it is possible that he was previously attached to the cathedral priory at Rochester, which receives a noticeable degree of attention in his work.

== Prologus de Construccione Westmonasterii ==
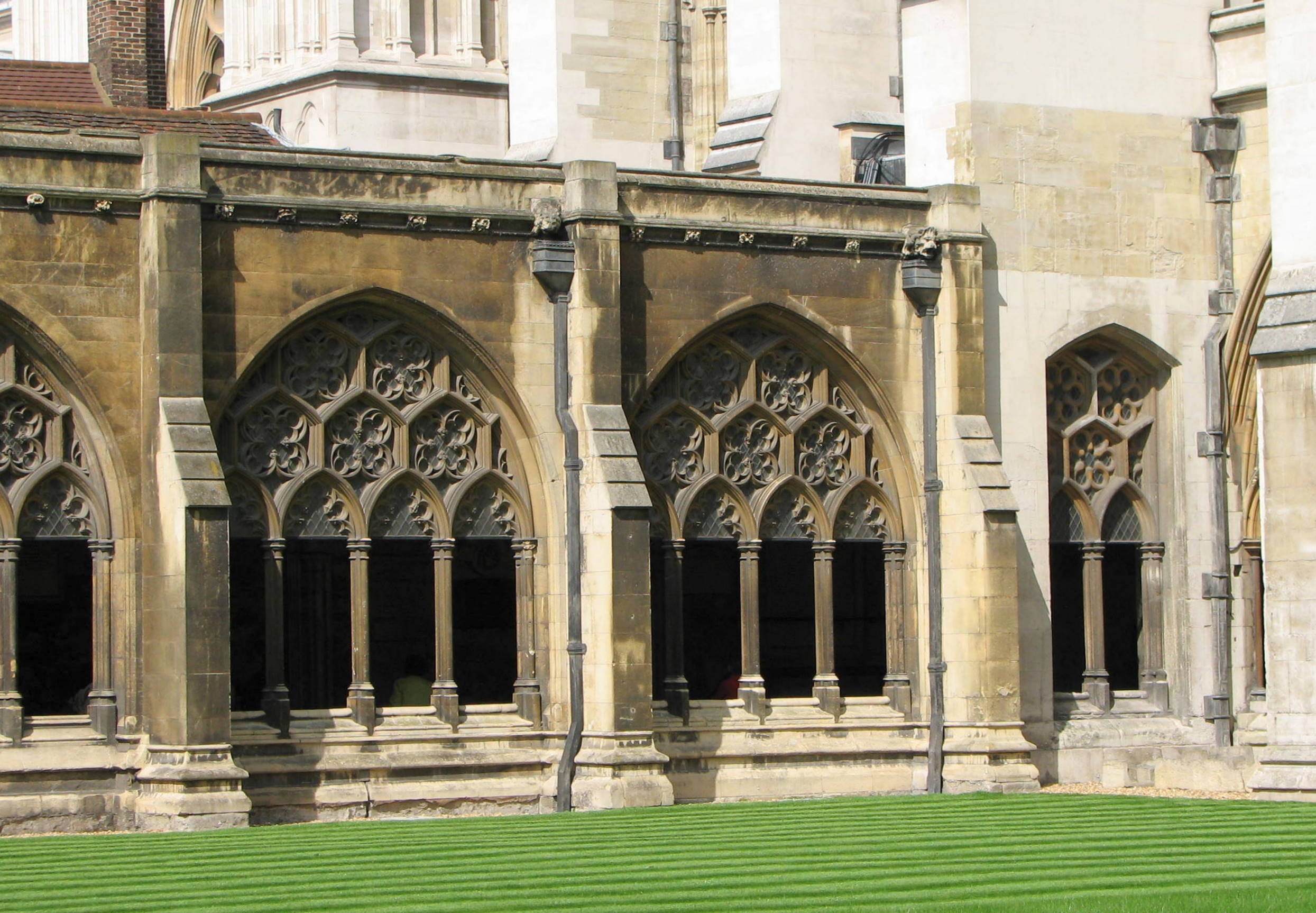
The present-day cloister of Westminster Abbey, where it is claimed that Sulcard was buried

The sole work which Sulcard is known to have produced is the so-called Prologus de Construccione Westmonasterii (“Prologue concerning the Building of Westminster”), dedicated to Abbot Vitalis of Bernay (c. 1076–?1085) and hence datable to about 1080. It relates the history of the abbey, beginning in the time of Mellitus, bishop of London (604—17), with the foundation of its first church on what was then Thorney Island by a wealthy Londoner and his wife. It concludes with the dedication of a new church erected by King Edward the Confessor (r. 1042–1066) for the monastery. In the dedication to Vitalis, Sulcard writes that he intended his work to serve as a ‘commemorative book’ (codex memorialis) for his house. He was primarily interested in promoting the cult of St. Peter, the abbey's patron saint, who is said to have miraculously appeared in the early 7th century to dedicate the church in person. Two copies of the history are extant, the earliest being a chartulary from Winchester (c. 1300), BL, Cotton MS Faustina A.iii, fols. 11r—16v. The other copy is in BL, Cotton MS Titus A.viii, fols. 2r–5v. The title is not contemporary, but derives from the heading in the former chartulary, to which it serves as a prologue.

Apart from relating local traditions about St. Peter's miraculous involvement, the narrative of Sulcard's prologus is relatively free of embellishments. It is valuable for casting some light on the memory of Edward the Confessor within a few decades after the Conquest. He drew upon the anonymous Vita Ædwardi Regis ("Life of King Edward"), at least Book I, which survives only in a later revision, and so bears testimony to its existence no later than 1084/1085. Sulcard's copy may have been the same text that was used by Osbert de Clare in c. 1138 and by the English historian Richard of Cirencester in the 14th century. Unlike Osbert de Clare, who used the Prologus and reworked Edward's Vita in c. 1138, Sulcard ascribes no miracles to Edward, suggesting that Westminster had not yet seen an active royal cult. Edward's role in the Prologus is small by comparison, even if he is remembered as a magnificent ruler, as in the account of his death "when not only England but also all other neighbouring kingdoms gave way to tears".

A critical edition of the text based primarily on MS Cotton Faustina A.iii was published in 1964 by Bernard W. Scholz. Portions of the text which are relevant to the Vita Ædwardi Regis have been edited and translated by Frank Barlow.

== Death and legacy ==
Sulcard was later said to have been awarded the privilege of burial in the abbey's cloister. At the instigation of Henry III (r. 1216–1272), his remains were translated to the newly built chapter house of the abbey. The Prologus continued to reach an audience throughout the Middle Ages and was extensively used by the monk John Flete (d. 1466) for his own History of Westminster Abbey.
