= André Wilmart =

French monk and scholar (1876–1941)

Dom André Wilmart O.S.B. (1876 – 21 April 1941 Paris) was a French Benedictine medievalist and liturgist, who spent most of his career at St Michael's Abbey, Farnborough. He was a leading expert on medieval spirituality in the decades between the World Wars. He studied at the University of Paris and the seminary of Saint-Sulpice at Issy. After an extended stay at the Abbey of Solesmes, he decided to become a monk, making his profession in 1901. Shortly after he entered Solesmes, the monks left for England due to ongoing conflict between the Catholic Church and the government of the Third Republic. Wilmart was ordained as a priest in 1906. Soon afterwards he was sent to Farnborough, which was his home for the rest of his life.

In addition to Wilmart's work as a scholar, he knew and was influenced by Catholic public intellectuals such as Charles Péguy and Baron von Hügel.

Wilmart's most significant work is Auteurs spirituels et textes dévots du moyen âge latin (Paris: Bloud et Gay, 1932, reissued by Brepols, 1971), which remains an important handbook on the topic. Among other discoveries, he is responsible for recovering the works of John of Fécamp. He was chosen to edit a catalogue of the Reginensis manuscript collection in the Vatican Library (the manuscripts of Queen Christina of Sweden), which became his major project in the 1930s. He was a Corresponding Fellow of the Medieval Academy of America from 1928. He was the author of more than 375 books and articles; a complete bibliography of his lifetime's work was published as a separate book.
