= Creully sur Seulles =

- Commune
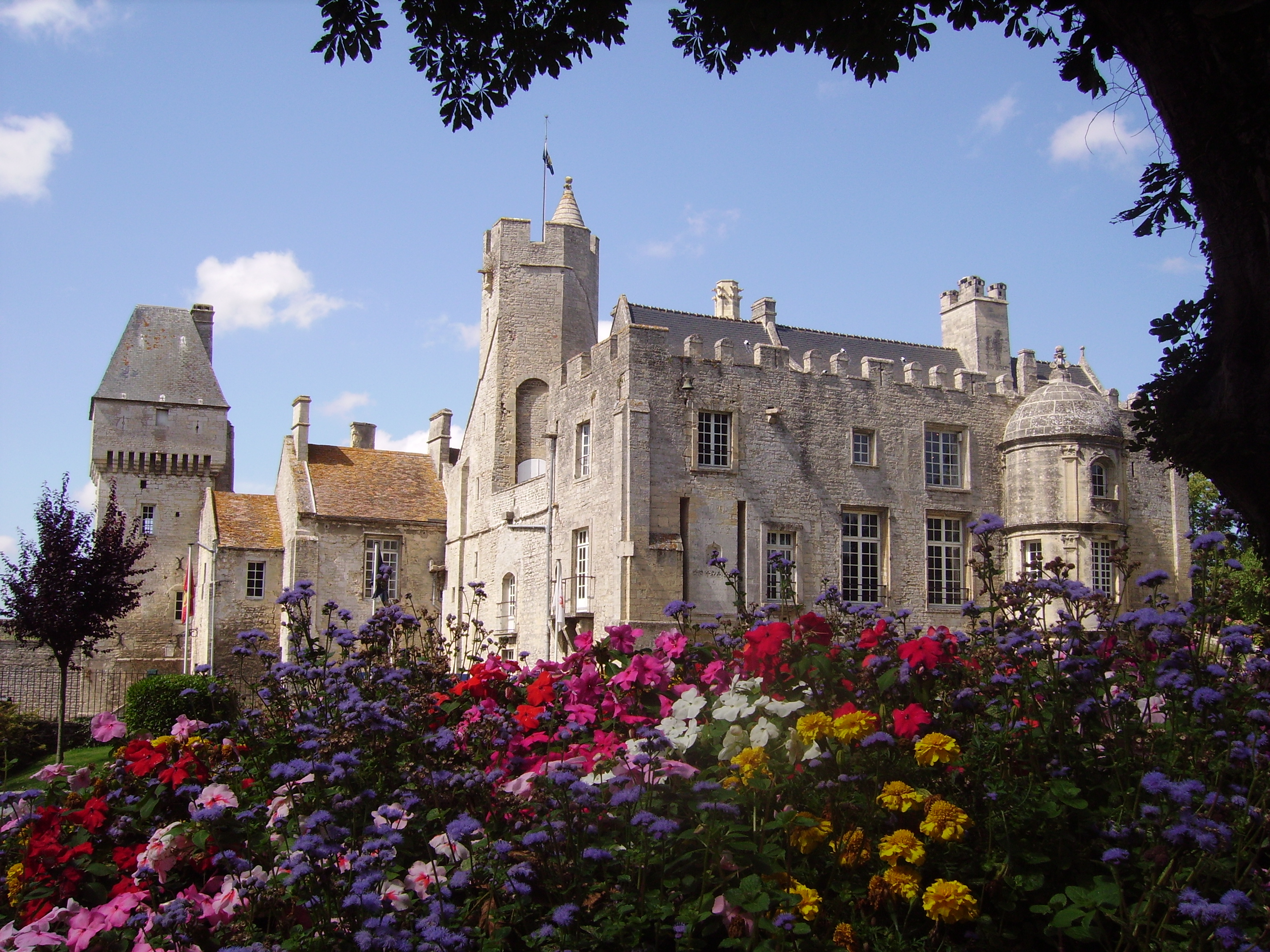
- The chateau in Creully
- Location of Creully sur Seulles
- Location within France Location within Normandy
- Coordinates: 49°17′02″N 0°32′20″W
- Country: France
- Region: Normandy
- Department: Calvados
- Arrondissement: Bayeux
- Canton: Thue et Mue
- Intercommunality: CC Seulles Terre Mer

Government
  - Mayor (2020–2026): Thierry Ozenne
- Area^{1}: 18.71 km^{2} (7.22 sq mi)
- Population (2023): 2,261
  - Density: 120.8/km^{2} (313.0/sq mi)
- Time zone: UTC+01:00 (CET)
  - Summer (DST): UTC+02:00 (CEST)
- INSEE/Postal code: 14200 /14480
- ^{1} French Land Register data, which excludes lakes, ponds, glaciers > 1 km^{2} (0.386 sq mi or 247 acres) and river estuaries.

Creully sur Seulles (French pronunciation: [kʁøli syʁ sœl], literally Creully on Seulles) is a commune in the department of Calvados, northwestern France. The municipality was established on 1 January 2017 by merger of the former communes of Creully (the seat), Saint-Gabriel-Brécy and Villiers-le-Sec.

== Population ==
Population data refer to the commune in its geography as of January 2025.

Historical population
| Year | Pop. | ±% p.a. |
|---|---|---|
| 1968 | 1,494 | — |
| 1975 | 1,241 | −2.62% |
| 1982 | 1,604 | +3.73% |
| 1990 | 1,974 | +2.63% |
| 1999 | 1,969 | −0.03% |
| 2007 | 2,104 | +0.83% |
| 2012 | 2,362 | +2.34% |
| 2017 | 2,278 | −0.72% |
| 2023 | 2,261 | −0.12% |
Source: INSEE

== See also ==
- Communes of the Calvados department
