= Richard of Ware =

Richard of Ware (died 8 December 1283) was the abbot of Westminster Abbey from 1258 to 1283.

Richard was responsible for arranging the transportation of workers and marble from Rome for the creation of the pavement at Westminster. He also commissioned the creation of a new customary. The customary was compiled by his sub-prior William of Haseley. As abbot, Richard fell into conflict with the Franciscan archbishop of Canterbury, John Peckham, over the rights and jurisdiction of the abbey. He was buried at the abbey in front of the high altar, the inscription (as recorded by John Flete) reading:

Abbot Richard of Ware, who rests here, now bears those stones which he himself bore hither from the City.

== Bibliography ==
- Westminster Abbey. "Richard de Ware".
- "Ware, Richard of (d. 1283)". Oxford Dictionary of National Biography (online ed.). Oxford University Press. doi:10.1093/ref:odnb/94165. (Subscription or UK public library membership required.)
- Jordan, William C. (2009). A tale of two monasteries: Westminster and Saint-Denis in the thirteenth century. Princeton: Princeton University Press. ISBN 978-0-691-13901-2.
