= Creully =

Commune in Calvados, France

- Part of Creully sur Seulles
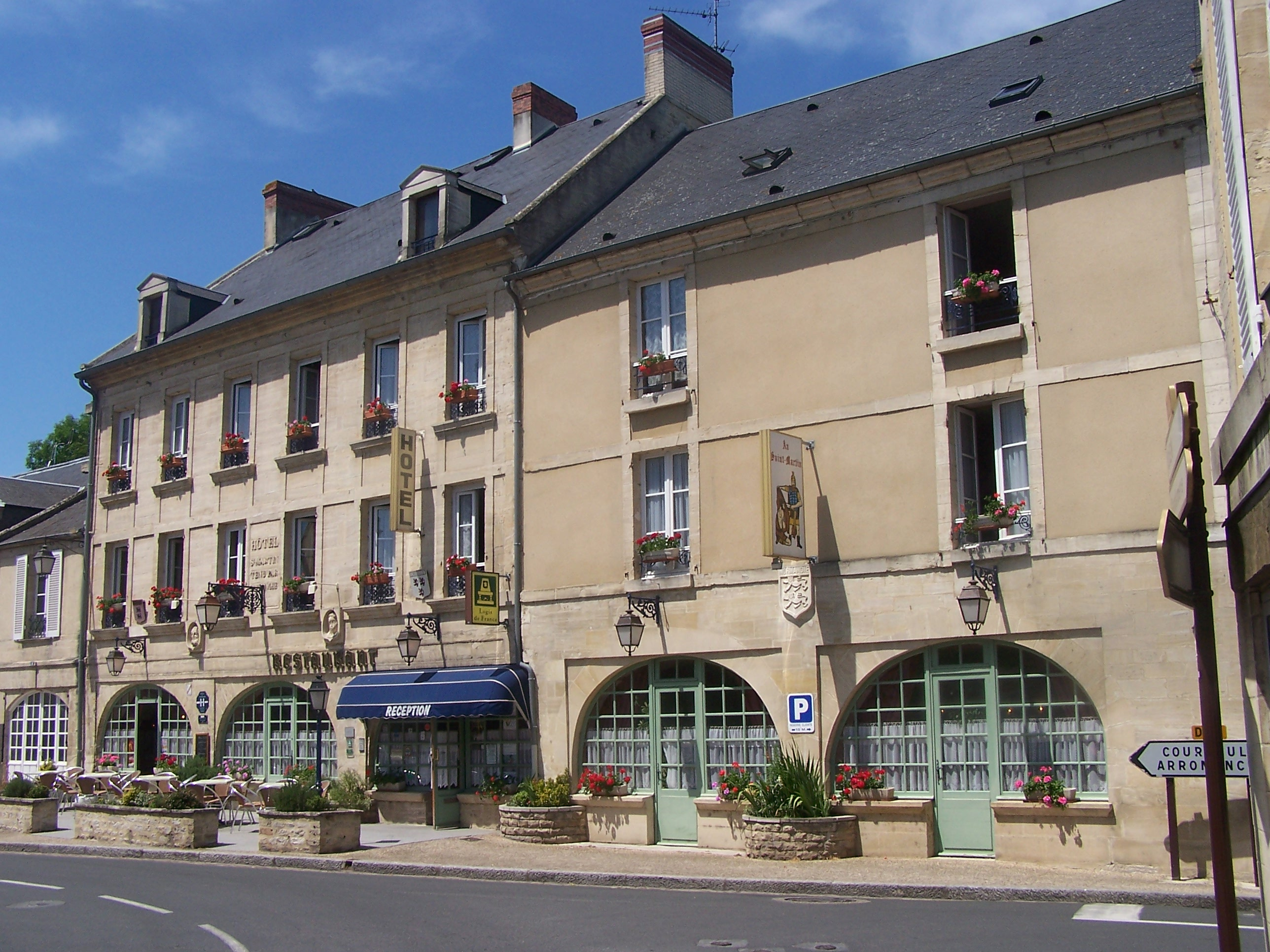

- Coat of arms
- Location of Creully
- Location within France Location within Normandy
- Coordinates: 49°17′04″N 0°32′22″W
- Country: France
- Region: Normandy
- Department: Calvados
- Arrondissement: Caen
- Canton: Thue et Mue
- Commune: Creully sur Seulles
- Area^{1}: 8.56 km^{2} (3.31 sq mi)
- Elevation: 40 m (130 ft)
- Highest elevation: 61 m (200 ft)
- Lowest elevation: 7 m (23 ft)
- Population (2018): 1,586
  - Density: 185/km^{2} (480/sq mi)
- Time zone: UTC+01:00 (CET)
  - Summer (DST): UTC+02:00 (CEST)
- Postal code: 14480
- ^{1} French Land Register data, which excludes lakes, ponds, glaciers > 1 km^{2} (0.386 sq mi or 247 acres) and river estuaries.

Creully (French pronunciation: [kʁøli]) is a former commune in the Calvados department in the Normandy region in northwestern France. On 1 January 2017, it was merged into the new commune Creully sur Seulles.

The town square is named after Canadian Lieutenant Bill McCormick of the 1st Hussars Canadian Armoured Regiment (London, Ontario). Lt. McCormick was the only Allied soldier to reach his D-Day objective when on 6 June 1944, after the tank he commanded passed through Creully, it reached the Caen-Bayeux road.

The school in Creully, Normandy, is named Cecil Newton Primary School in honour of Second World War veteran Cecil Newton.

== Population ==
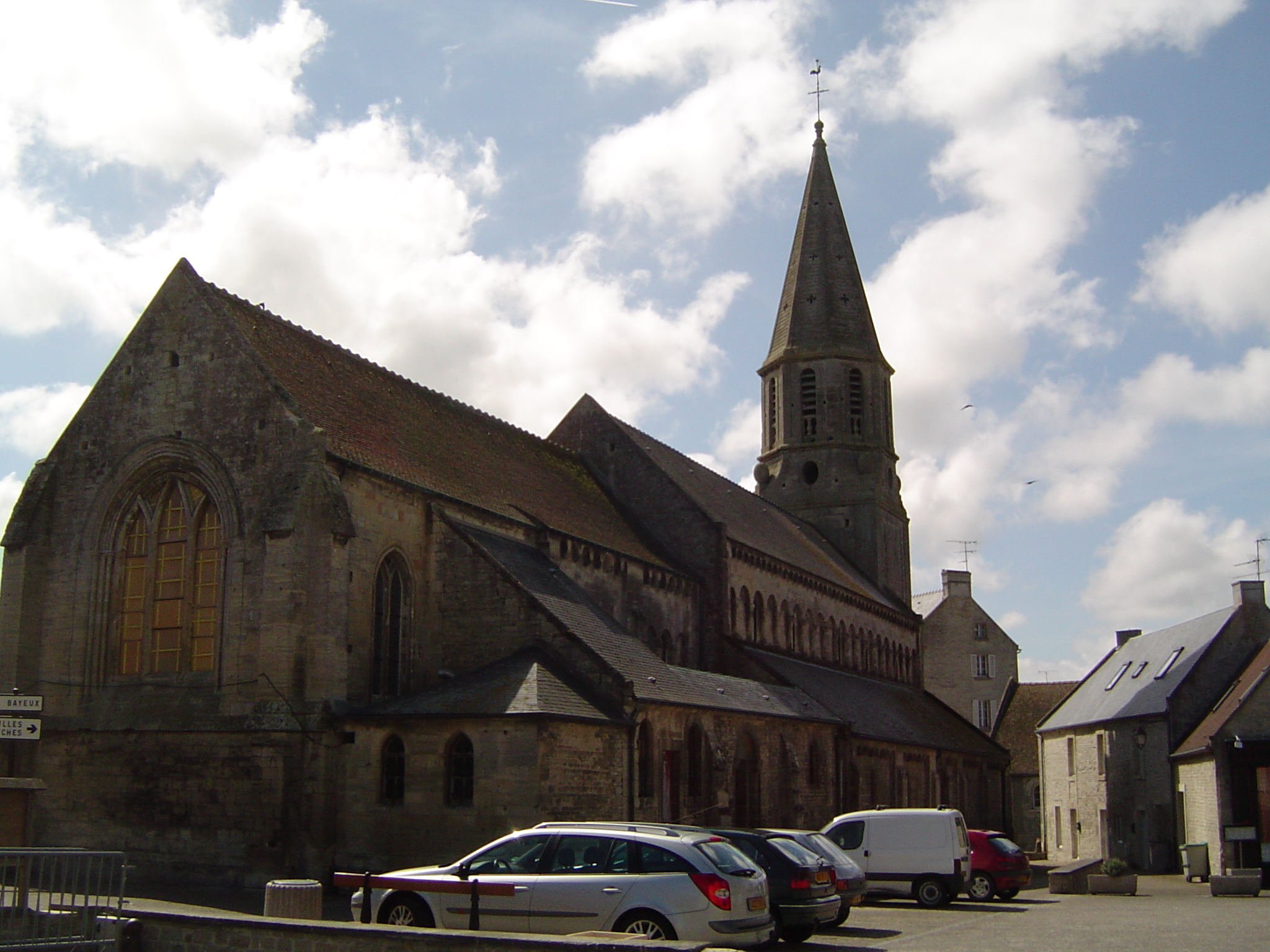

Historical population
Year	Pop.	±% p.a.
1962	692	—
1968	817	+2.81%
1975	692	−2.34%
1982	1,003	+5.45%
1990	1,396	+4.22%
1999	1,426	+0.24%
2018	1,586	+0.56%
Source: EHESS and INSEE

== See also ==
- Communes of the Calvados department
- Château de Creully
