= Abbot of Westminster =

Head of Westminster Abbey in London, England

The Abbot of Westminster was the head (abbot) of Westminster Abbey, until the reformation, when the position was replaced by the Dean of Westminster. The position of Abbot of Westminster was a significant role in English history, with the abbots overseeing Westminster Abbey from its early days as a Benedictine monastery through major transformations over the centuries.

== List of Abbots ==
Abbots
Edwin	1049 – c. 1071
Geoffrey of Jumièges	c. 1071 – c. 1075
Vitalis of Bernay	c. 1076 – 1085
Gilbert Crispin	1085 – 1117
Herbert	1121 – c. 1136
Gervase de Blois	1138 – c. 1157
Laurence	c. 1158 – 1173
Walter of Winchester	1175 – 1190
William Postard	1191 – 1200
Ralph de Arundel (alias Papillon)	1200 – 1214
William de Humez	1214 – 1222
Richard de Berkying	1222 – 1246
Richard de Crokesley	1246 – 1258
Phillip de Lewisham	1258
Richard de Ware	1258 – 1283
Walter de Wenlok	1283 – 1307
Richard de Kedyngton (alias Sudbury)	1308 – 1315
William de Curtlyngton	1315 – 1333
Thomas de Henley	1333 – 1344
Simon de Bircheston	1344 – 1349
Simon Langham	1349 – 1362
Nicholas de Litlyngton	1362 – 1386
William de Colchester	1386 – 1420
Richard Harweden	1420 – 1440
Edmund Kyrton	1440 – 1462
George Norwich	1463 – 1469
Thomas Mylling	1469 – 1474, later Bishop of Hereford
John Esteney	1474 – 1498
George Fascet	1498 – 1500
John Islip	1500 – 1532
William Benson (Abbot Boston)	1533 – 1540
Bishop intra-Reformation
Thomas Thirlby	1540 – 1550
Deans intra-Reformation
William Benson (Abbot Boston)	1540 – 1549
Richard Cox	1549 – 1553
Hugh Weston	1553 – 1556
Abbot restored by Mary I of England
John Feckenham	1556 – 1559
Deans post-Reformation
See List of Deans of Westminster Abbey	1560 – present
