= Richard of Barking =

Richard of Barking (died 1246) was an English Benedictine, the Abbot of Westminster, and a leading judge.

== Life ==
He was for some years prior of the Abbey of Westminster, and on 14 October 1222 was elected abbot in succession to Humeto or Humez, receiving the benediction from Peter des Roches, Bishop of Winchester. He became a privy councillor, and a baron of the exchequer next in rank to William de Shareshull. According to William Dugdale and John Weever, he was chief baron; but it is doubtful whether such an office existed at the time.

In 1243 mandates to the sheriffs of counties to collect scutage money for the king Henry III's expedition to Gascony are tested in his name, and he appears at that time to have been a favourite and attendant upon the king. In 1245 he, with Walter Mauclerk, was king's deputy or lord justice of the kingdom during the king's absence in the Welsh wars, and on that ground he was excused from attendance at the First Council of Lyon the year before.

He died 23 November 1246, having increased the revenues of his abbey by the addition of the churches of Ocham, Aschewell, and Strengesham, the manor of Thorpe, the castle of Morton Folet, the village of New Morton, Gloucestershire, and one half the manors of Longdon, Worcestershire and Chadesley, in Worcestershire. He was buried in a marble tomb before the altar of the Virgin in the lady chapel built in Humeto's abbacy; his tomb was destroyed in the time of Abbot William de Colchester.
