= William de Haseley =

English monastic writer (died c. 1283)

William de Haseley (fl. 1266; died in or before 1283) was an English monastic writer. He was sub-prior of the Benedictine community at Westminster Abbey and master of the novices. He entered the monastery in about 1266 and compiled the Consuetudinarium Monachorum Westmonasteriensium for his abbot, Richard de la Ware.

== Life ==
William de Haseley, a monk of Westminster, "magister novitorum", and finally sub-prior there, compiled, at the request of Richard de la Ware, abbot of Westminster, in 1266 the Consuetudinarium Monachorum Westmonasteriensium, part of which is extant among the Cotton MSS. He also acquired some books for the monastic library. He was buried in the church around 1283, for on 3 May 1283 Hugh Balsham (or Belesale), then the Bishop of Ely, granted an indulgence of twenty days to all persons visiting Westminster Abbey and praying at Haseley's tomb. A copy of the indulgence is among the muniments of Westminster Abbey.

== Sources ==
- Harvey, Barbara F. (2004). "Haseley, William of (d. in or before 1283), monastic writer". Oxford Dictionary of National Biography (online ed.). Oxford University Press. doi:10.1093/ref:odnb/12545. (Subscription, Wikipedia Library access or UK public library membership required.)
- "William de Haseley". Westminster Abbey. Retrieved 16 October 2022.

Attribution:

- This article incorporates text from a publication now in the public domain: Hardy, William John (1891). "Haseley, William de". In Stephen, Leslie; Lee, Sidney (eds.). Dictionary of National Biography. Vol. 25. London: Smith, Elder & Co. p. 106.
