= Saint-Vigor Priory =

Abbey in Calvados, France

Coordinates: 49°16′48″N 0°41′19″W

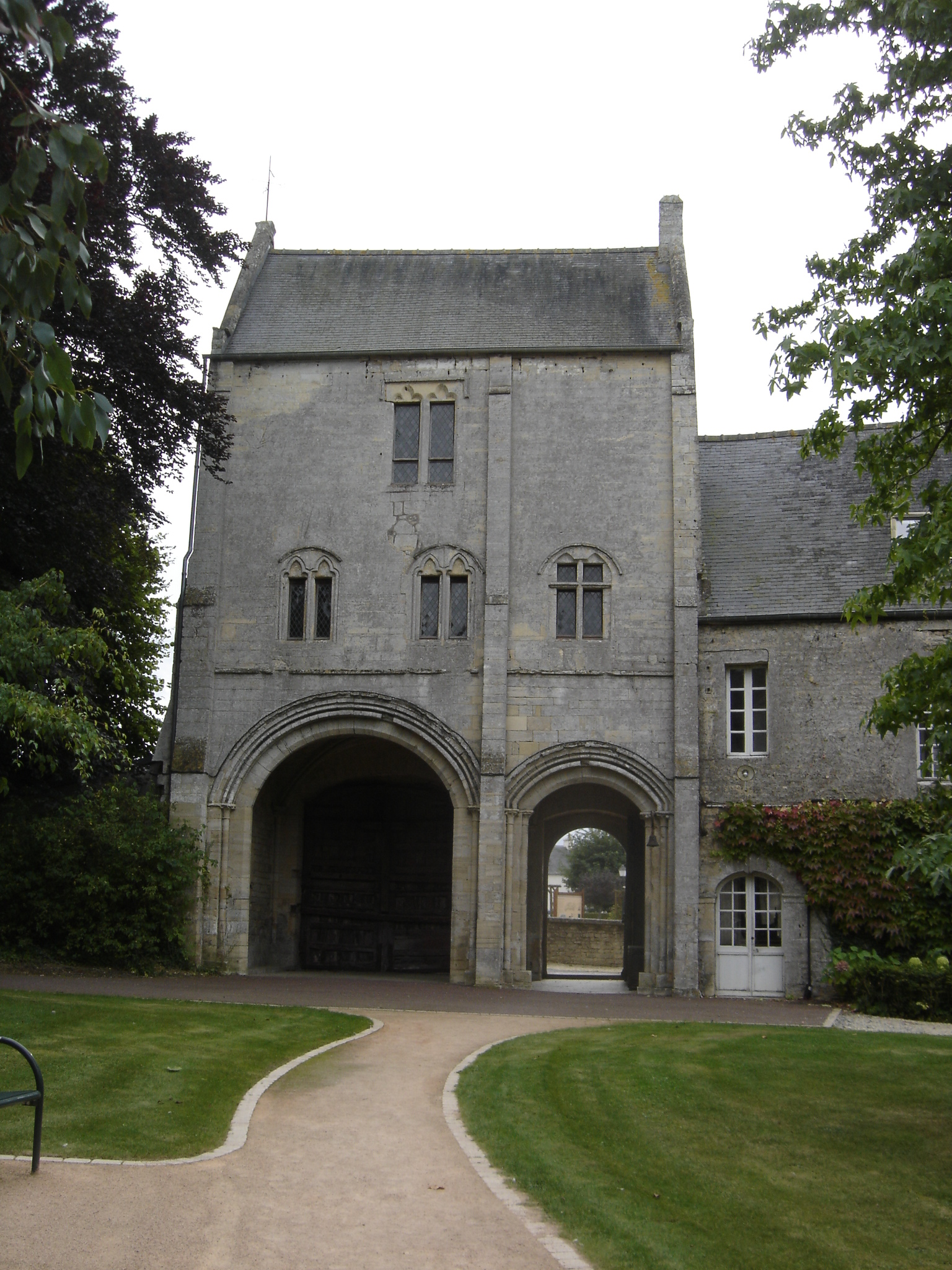
Priory gatehouse

Saint-Vigor Priory, formerly Saint-Vigor Abbey (French: Prieuré Saint-Vigor; Abbaye Saint-Vigor-le-Grand), was a Benedictine monastery in the town of Saint-Vigor-le-Grand in Calvados, Normandy, France. Its foundation is attributed to Saint Vigor, bishop of Bayeux in the first third of the 6th century. It was destroyed in the late 10th century by the invading Normans. In the late 11th century Odo, bishop of Bayeux, attempted a revival of the monastery as an independent abbey but it was not successful, and in the 1090s the community was made a dependent priory of the Abbey of St. Benignus, Dijon. The abbey relinquished its rights over the priory in 1702. The reformist Congregation of St. Maur took it on in 1712. It was suppressed in 1790 in the French Revolution.

It has been listed as a historical monument since 1908.
