= Saint-Gabriel-Brécy =

- Part of Creully sur Seulles
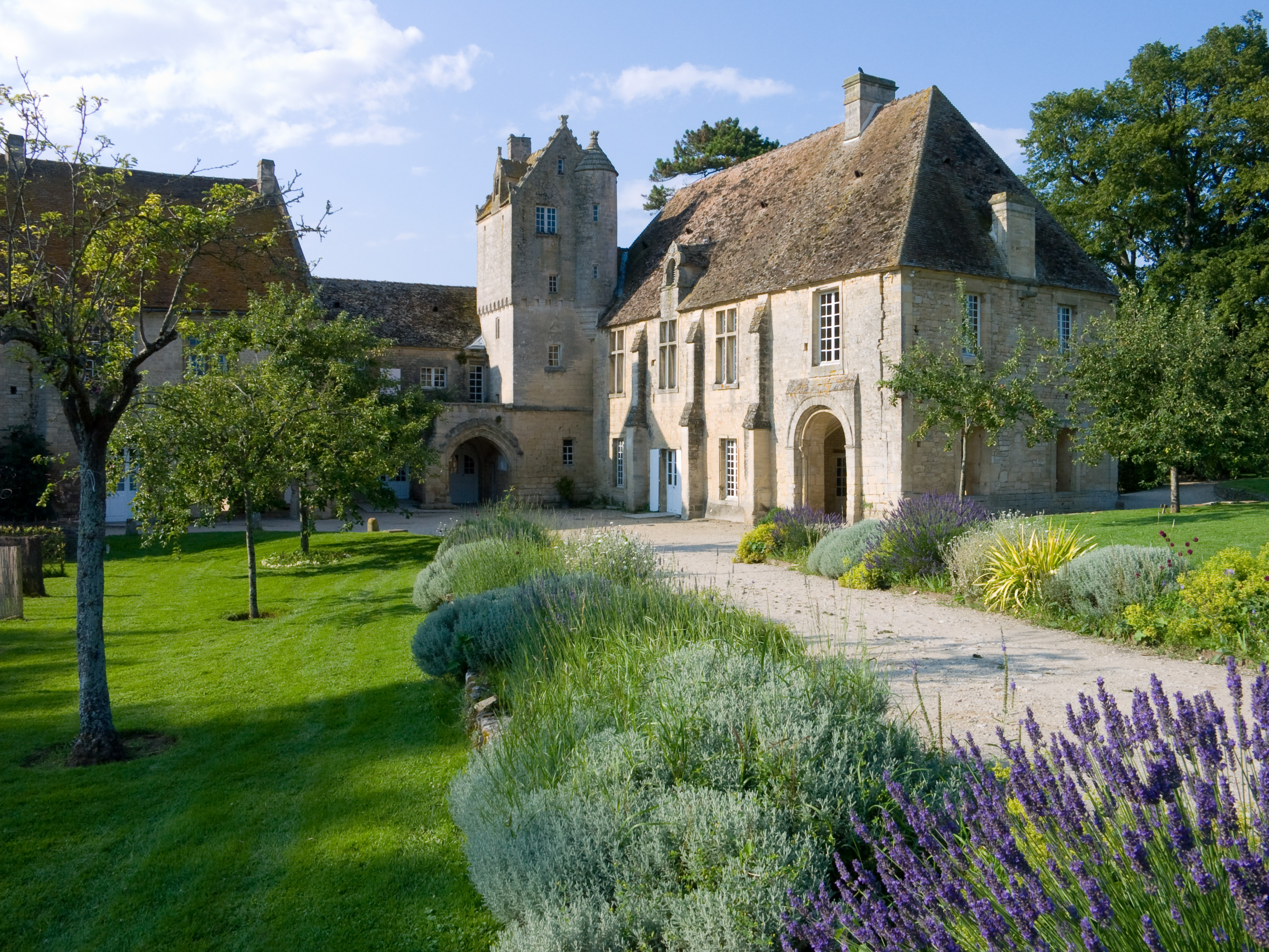
- Former Saint-Gabriel Priory
- Location of Saint-Gabriel-Brécy
- Location within France Location within Normandy
- Coordinates: 49°16′43″N 0°33′50″W
- Country: France
- Region: Normandy
- Department: Calvados
- Arrondissement: Bayeux
- Canton: Thue et Mue
- Commune: Creully sur Seulles
- Area^{1}: 7.44 km^{2} (2.87 sq mi)
- Elevation: 50 m (160 ft)
- Highest elevation: 63 m (207 ft)
- Lowest elevation: 10 m (33 ft)
- Population (2018): 380
  - Density: 51/km^{2} (130/sq mi)
- Time zone: UTC+01:00 (CET)
  - Summer (DST): UTC+02:00 (CEST)
- Postal code: 14480
- ^{1} French Land Register data, which excludes lakes, ponds, glaciers > 1 km^{2} (0.386 sq mi or 247 acres) and river estuaries.

Saint-Gabriel-Brécy (French pronunciation: [sɛ̃ ɡabʁijɛl bʁesi]) is a former commune in the Calvados department in the Normandy region in northwestern France. On 1 January 2017, it was merged into the new commune Creully sur Seulles.

== See also ==
- Communes of the Calvados department
