= John Flete =

John Flete (ca. 1398 – 1466) was an English monk and ecclesiastical historian who documented the history and abbots of Westminster Abbey.

He entered the monastery at Westminster some time around 1420. For some years, he was an ordinary cloistered monk, but he became the almoner around 1435. Later, he became prior of the abbey from 1456 to 1466 and served under two successive abbots who were replaced for poor management. He was himself caught up in some of the allegations of mismanagement. In 1444 the misbehavior of the abbot Kirton led to examination from outside "visitors," and they had Flete suspended from his position for a time.

His major work was the four volume History of Westminster Abbey from its founding by, according to him, "King Lucius" in 184, to around 1386. He had wanted to continue the history up to 1443, but his removal from office kept him from his plan. In general, the history copies from other sources, including a lost Liber regius, Sulcard's Prologus de Construccione Westmonasterii, charters, pipe rolls, papal letters, and other documents the abbey had in its possession. However, his own contribution to history was in including a small biography of each abbot of the monastery. These biographies were generally standardized—providing the date of election, major accomplishments, date of death, place of entombment, and epitaph for each. According to Barbara Harvey, the chief value of the history was in demonstrating how ecclesiastical historiography was moving away from a national interest toward a local and biographical one in the late Middle Ages.
