= William Benson (abbot) =

English Benedictine, first Dean of Westminster

William Benson (1495 – 1549) was an English Benedictine, the last Abbot of Westminster and first Dean of Westminster. He was a friend of Thomas Cranmer, and belonged to the evangelical circle around Cranmer that included Thomas Goodrich, Hugh Latimer and Thomas Thirlby.

== Life ==
A native of Boston, Lincolnshire, Benson was apparently educated in some religious house belonging to the Benedictine order, of which he was a member. He took, according to custom in the order, the name of the town where he was born (i.e. Boston). He resumed the name Benson in later life. Until 1521, when he graduated B.D. at Cambridge University, little is known of him. He took the degree of D.D. in 1528.

Two years later he appears as one of the doctors to whom the university referred the question of the validity of the marriage of Henry VIII with Catharine of Aragon, when its opinion on the matter was sought by the king, and voted with the majority against the marriage. In the following year (27 March 1531) he was elected abbot of the Benedictine Burton Abbey, Burton-on-Trent. About 1532–3 he resigned this office to be elected abbot of Westminster, although not a previous member of the chapter, as every abbot had been since William Humez, who died in 1222. It is probable that a sum of 661l. 13s. 4d., which Cromwell received from him about the same time, was a part of the price of the preferment, and the 500l., to secure which three of the best manors belonging to the abbey were assigned to Cromwell and Paulet shortly after his election, may have been the balance (cf. Letters and Papers, Foreign and Domestic, Henry VIII, vi. 578, No. 25).

Benson assisted John Stokesley, the Bishop of London at the christening of the Lady Elizabeth, which took place in September 1533 in the Church of the Friars Minors of the Order of St. Francis at Greenwich. In the following year he was appointed, jointly with Thomas Cranmer, Thomas Audley, and Cromwell, to administer the oath to accept, on pain of high treason, the statute defining the succession to the crown, in the preamble of which the marriage of Queen Catharine was declared void (25 Hen. 8. c. 22).

Sir Thomas More finding himself unable to take the oath without at the same time distinguishing between the preamble and the operative part of the act, Benson endeavoured to induce him to ‘change his conscience’. More, however, refused to take the oath, was placed under arrest on Monday, 13 April 1534, Benson having the custody of him until the following Friday, when he was committed to the Tower of London. The same year (1534) Benson defended the privilege of sanctuary claimed by the collegiate church of St. Martin's-le-Grand, which had been annexed to the abbey by Henry VII, against the corporation of London, trying to suppress what was felt to be an intolerable nuisance. They failed, however, on this as on previous occasions, and Benson had a document drawn up and enrolled in the Court of Chancery accurately defining the extent of the privilege. He subscribed the articles of religion formulated in 1536, the year in which he surrendered to the king the manors of Neyte (whence Knightsbridge), Hyde, now Hyde Park, Eybury, and Todington, the advowson of Chelsea, some meadows near the horse-ferry between Westminster and Lambeth, Covent Garden, and some lands at Greenwich, in exchange for Hurley Priory in Berkshire. On 15 October 1537 he was present at the christening of the Prince of Wales at Hampton Court.

In 1539, he was summoned to the parliament which passed the law of the Six Articles. Early next year (16 January) he surrendered his monastery to the king, and on the establishment of the cathedral was made its dean. In this year he signed the document by which Henry's marriage with Anne of Cleves was nullified.

He was present at convocation in 1547, when the right of the clergy to marry was discussed, and declared himself in favour of the lawfulness of matrimony. He does not, however, seem to have been married himself. In an undated letter to Cromwell, written before 1540, he begs to be relieved of his office, describing himself as feeble. He remained there, however, for many years afterwards, during which the abbey became impoverished, owing to the depreciation of money and the rapacious greed of the Protector Somerset, who in 1549 secularised its appanage of St. Martin's-le-Grand, and extorted the surrender of fourteen of its manors under threat to demolish the entire structure.

Benson's death the same year purportedly was hastened over his distress. He was buried in the abbey in the chapel of St. Blaize, but the inscription on his tomb has been obliterated. He made bequests to the reformers Martin Bucer and Paul Fagius.

== Sources ==
- Diarmaid MacCulloch (1996), Thomas Cranmer
