= John of Fécamp =

11th-century Italian spiritual writer

John of Fécamp, (early 11th century - 22 February 1079) was an Italian-Norman Benedictine who was the most widely read of early medieval spiritual writers before the Imitation of Christ became popular (published circa 1418–1427), during a period called the Golden Age of Monasticism and of Scholasticism, and the height of the Papacy. Writing under the name of famous writers, he wrote the very popular book Meditations of St. Augustine and the book Meditations. He was born near Ravenna and died at Fécamp Abbey in Normandy where he was abbot. He was nicknamed 'Jeannelin' or 'Little John' on account of his diminutive stature.

== Life ==
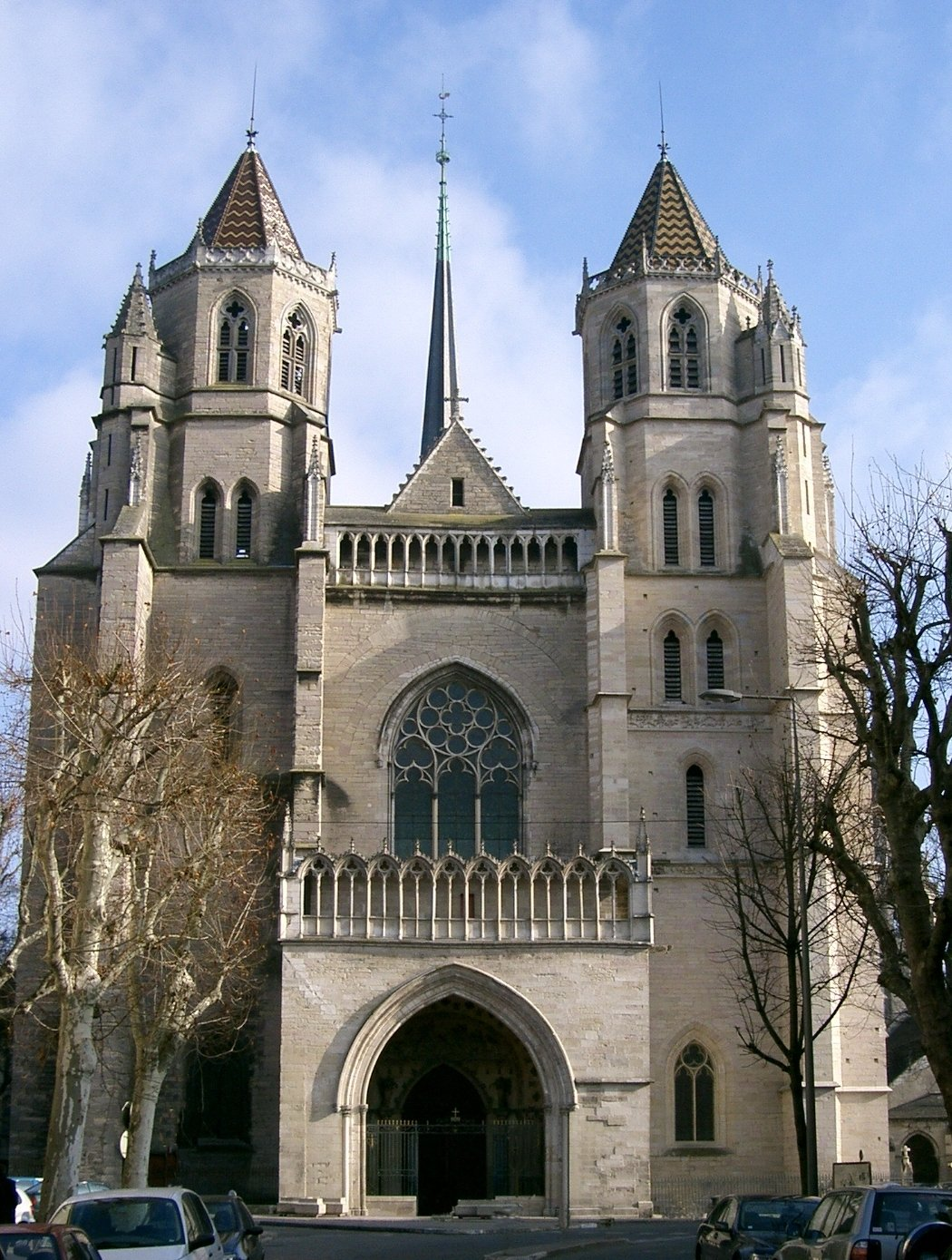
Cathedral of Saint Bénigne, Dijon, built on the site of the Abbey of Saint Bénigne

At some point in the early 11th century, John left his homeland (where it is possible he had lived for some time as a hermit) and travelled to France, probably at the invitation of his compatriot and uncle William of Volpiano. John joined William at the Abbey of Saint Bénigne (or Saint Benignus), in Dijon, where William was abbot. In the following years this served as a basis for their wide-ranging renovation of monastic life in central and northern France. When in 1017 William was commissioned to reform the Abbey of Fécamp and to establish there a colony of Benedictine monks by becoming abbot there, John again accompanied him. John assumed the office of prior at the Abbey, a post he held until 1028, when on his retirement to Italy, William appointed John his successor as abbot.

As abbot of Fécamp for the next fifty years, John embodied much of the best of traditional Benedictine monasticism. A tireless administrator and disciplinarian, he solidified Fécamp's land holdings, took charge of Saint Bénigne along with his own abbey when Bénigne experienced a leadership crisis, and reformed two other monasteries. He expanded Fécamp's school and library, such that in the 1070s, the library possessed 87 manuscripts, virtually all acquired during his abbacy.

In 1052, on the elevation of Helinard to the archiepiscopal see of Lyon, John was invited to succeed him as Abbot of Dijon. At first he retained also the abbacy of Fécamp, but, finding himself unable to carry the double burden, he resigned this office in 1056. Towards the close of his life he undertook a pilgrimage to the Holy Land. Seized and thrown into prison by the Turks, it was only in 1076 that he could return to France. He then retired to Fécamp, where he died in 1079.

== Works ==
As Abbot of St. Bénigne John had been brought into close relations with the Emperor Henry III (after 1038 also King of Burgundy) and with his spouse, Agnes of Poitiers. After Henry's death his widow placed herself under the spiritual guidance of the abbot, and for her John composed a series of ascetical works. These were entitled the "Liber precum variarum", "De divina contemplatio Christique amore", "De superna Hierusalem," "De institutione viduae," "De vita et moribus virginum", "De eleemosynarum dispensatione" (Patrologia Latina CXLVII, 147 sqq., 445 sqq.).Some letters dealing with incidents in the life of the cloisters are also collected in P.L. loc. cit., 153 sq, notably his 'Letter to a Nun'.

John wrote a first book of prayers, his Confessio Theologica (Theological Confession), in three parts, composed before 1018. This book was then rearranged and reworked to form a second book, Libellus de scripturis et verbis patrum (The Little Book of Writings and Words of the Fathers for the Use especially of Those who are Lovers of the Contemplative Life). This second work, circulating under the title of The Meditations of Saint Augustine, proved very popular in the later medieval period.

He also wrote a Lament over Lost Leisure and Solitude.

John also wrote Meditationes (Meditations), excerpts of which circulated widely in the later Middle Ages, under the names of more famous writers.

The fact that John's work almost entirely circulated under pseudonyms during the medieval period, including Ambrose, Augustine, John Cassian, Alcuin, Anselm and Bernard of Clairvaux, means that it was only in the 20th century that a greater understanding of his own thought was developed. It is only therefore in recent times that it has been acknowledged that until the spread of the Imitation of Christ at the end of the Middle Ages he was one of the most widely read spiritual writers.

== See also ==
- André Wilmart
