= Index of history articles =

History is the study of the past. When used as the name of a field of study, history refers to the study and interpretation of the record of humans, families, and societies as preserved primarily through written sources. This is a list of history topics covered on English Wikipedia:

== A ==
- Abkhazia, History of
- Adena culture
- Afghanistan, History of
- Africa, History of
- Age of Discovery
- Age of Enlightenment
- Age of Exploration
- Age of Reason
- Age of Sail
- Agriculture, History of
- Akrotiri and Dhekelia, History of
- Åland, History of
- Albania, History of
- Alfred the Great
- Algeria, History of
- Alternative history
- American history
- American Revolution
- American Samoa, History of
- Ancient China
- Ancient Egypt
- Ancient Greece
- Ancient history
- Ancient India
- Ancient Japan
- Ancient Korea
- Ancient Rome
- Ancient warfare
- Andorra, History of
- Angola, History of
- Anguilla, History of
- Antigua and Barbuda, History of
- Archaeology
- Architecture, History of
- Argentina
- Armenia, History of
- Art history
- Aruba, History of
- Ascension Island, History of
- Asia, History of
- Assyria
- Atomic Age
- Australia, History of

- Prehistory
- Before 1788
- 1788–1850
- 1851–1900
- 1901–1945
- Since 1945

- Austria, History of
- Aviation history
- Axial Age
- Azerbaijan, History of
- Aztecs

== B ==
- Bahamas, History of the
- Bahrain, History of
- Bangladesh, History of

- East Pakistan

- Battle
- Babylonia
- Banking, History of
- Barda, History of
- Belarus, History of
- Belgium, History of
- Bias
- Bibliography of history
- Biography
- Botswana, History of
- Brazil, History of

- Colonial
- Empire

- Britain, History of

- Ancient
- Roman
- Empire

- Bronze Age
- Business history
- Byzantine Empire

== C ==
- Cambodia, History of
- Cameroon, History of
- Canada, History of
  - First Nations
- Carolingian Renaissance
  - Carolingian writing
  - Carolingian art
  - Carolingian architecture
  - Carolingian music
- Chad, History of
- China, History of

- Xia dynasty
- Shang dynasty
- Zhou dynasty
- Qin dynasty
- Han dynasty
- Three Kingdoms
- First Jin dynasty
- Sixteen Kingdoms
- Southern and Northern dynasties
- Sui dynasty
- Tang dynasty
- Five Dynasties and Ten Kingdoms period
- Liao dynasty
- Song dynasty
- Western Xia dynasty
- Second Jin dynasty
- Yuan dynasty
- Ming dynasty
- Qing dynasty
- Republic of
- People's Republic of

- Chile, History of
- Chronology
- Cold War
- Colombia, History of
- Colonialism, History of
- Contemporary history
- Congo, Democratic Republic
- Congo, Republic
- Copper Age
- Croatia, History of
- Crusades

- First
- Second
- Third
- Livonian
- German
- Fourth
- Albigensian
- Children's
- Fifth
- Prussian
- Sixth
- Seventh
- Shepherds' 1251
- Eighth
- Ninth
- Aragonese
- Shepherds' 1320
- Alexandrian
- Nicopolis
- Northern
- Hussite
- Varna
- Otranto
- Ottoman–Habsburg wars
- Lepanto
- Vienna

- Cuba, History of

- Revolution

- Cultural history
- Cyprus, History of
- Czech Republic, History of

== D ==
- Dark Ages (historiography)
- Death of Alexander the Great
- Decolonization
- Denmark, History of
- Digital Age
- Divine Right of Kings

== E ==
- Economic history
- Education, History of
- Egypt, History of

- Ancient
- Achaemenid
- Ptolemaic
- Roman
- Arab
- Ottoman
- Muhammad Ali dynasty
- Modern

- Eighty Years' War
- History of England

- Reformation
- Civil War

- Ethiopia, History of
- Europe, History of

- European Union

- Environmental history

== F ==
- Falkland Islands, History of
- Fashion design, History of
- Finland, History of
- France, History of

- Prehistoric
- Gaul
- Roman Gaul
- Frankish Empire
- In the Middle Ages
- in the Early Modern Period
- Revolution
- First Republic
- First Empire
- Bourbon Restoration
- July Monarchy
- Second Republic
- Second Empire
- Third Republic
- Vichy France
- Provisional Government
- Fourth Republic
- Fifth Republic

- Forest history

== G ==
- Gender history
- Genealogy
- Germany, History of
  - Germanic tribes
  - Migration period
  - Frankish Empire
    - Merovingian dynasty
    - Carolingian dynasty
  - Holy Roman Empire
  - Early modern history of Germany
  - German confederation
  - North German Federation
  - German Empire
  - Weimar Republic
  - Nazi Germany
  - Partitions of Germany
    - East Germany
    - West Germany
  - Reunification of Germany
- Ghana, History of
- Great Depression
  - in Australia
  - in Canada
  - in France
  - in Latin America
  - in the Netherlands
  - in South Africa
  - in the United Kingdom
  - in the United States
- Greece, History of
- Guatemala, History of
- Gunpowder warfare

== H ==
- Haiti, History of
- Historical method
- Historical sociology
- Historicism
- Historiography
- History
- History from below
- Holocaust, the
- Holy Roman Empire
- Honduras, History of
- Hong Kong, History of
- Human history
- Hundred Years' War
- Hungary, History of
- Huns

== I ==
- Iceland, History of
- Ideas, History of
- Imperialism
- Inca Empire
- India, History of

- Middle kingdoms
- Mughal Empire
- British Raj
- Republic

- Indochina Wars
- Indonesia, History of
- Indus Valley civilization
- Industrial Age
- Industrial Revolution
- Industrial warfare
- Information Age
- The Internet, History of
- Inquisition
- Iran, History of

- Revolution

- Ireland, History of

- Early history of Ireland
- Norman Ireland

- Iron Age
- Italy, History of

== J ==
- Jamaica, History of
- Japan, History of

- Ancient
- Tokugawa shogunate
- Imperial

- Jersey, History of
- Jordan, History of

== K ==
- Kazakhstan, History of
- Kenya, History of
- Korea, History of

- Ancient
- North
- South
- Korean War

- Kosovo, History of
- King Arthur

== L ==
- Labor history
- Landscape history
- Laos, History of
- Latvia, History of
- League of Nations
- Lebanon, History of
- Lesotho, History of
- LGBT history
- Liberia, History of
- Libya, History of
- Liechtenstein, History of
- Lithuania, History of
- Local history
- Luxembourg, History of

== M ==
- Malaysia, History of
- Maritime history
- Maya civilization
- Medicine, History of
- Medieval warfare
- Meiji Restoration
- Mesoamerica
- Mesolithic period
- Mesopotamia
- Mexico, History of
- Middle Ages
- Migration
- Military Frontier
- Military history
  - Prehistoric warfare
  - Ancient warfare
  - Medieval warfare
  - Early Modern warfare
  - Industrial warfare
  - Modern warfare
- Minoan civilization
- Modern history
- Mongol Empire
- Mozambique, History of
- Music, History of
  - Prehistoric music
  - Ancient music
  - Early music
    - Medieval music
    - Renaissance music
    - Baroque music
  - Common practice period
    - Classical
    - Romantic music
  - 20th century music

== N ==
- Napoleonic Wars
- Nationalism
- Natural history
- Naval history
- Neolithic period
- Nepal, History
- New Imperialism
- New Zealand, History of
- Normans
- North America, History of

== O ==
- Oceania, History of
- Oman, History of
- Oral history
- Ottoman Empire

== P ==
- Pakistan, History of
- Palaeography
- Palau, History of
- Paleolithic period
- Palestine, History of
- Panama, History of
- Papua New Guinea, History of
- Paraguay, History of
- Parliamentary procedure, History of
- Pearl Harbor
- People's history
- Periodization
- Persian Empire
- Peru, History of

- Viceroyalty
- War of Independence

- Philippines, History of
- Philosophy of history
- Poland, History of

- Under the Piasts
- Under the Jagiellons
- First Republic
- Partitions
- Second Republic
- People's Republic

- Political history
- Political science, History of
- Political thought, History of
- Portugal, History of

- Empire of
- Civil War

- Prehistory
- Prehistoric art
- Prehistoric music
- Prehistoric warfare
- Protohistory
- Pseudohistory
- Psychohistory

== Q ==
- Qatar, History of
- Quantitative history

== R ==
- Rail transport, History of
- Religion, History of
- Renaissance
- Restoration (disambiguation),

- Bourbon
- English
- European
- Meiji
- Spanish
- Swiss

- Revolution,

- 1848
- American
- Communist
- Cuban
- French
- Industrial
- Russian
- Singing (Latvia)

- Road transport, History of
- Romani people, History of
- Romania, History of
- Rome,

- Ancient
- Empire of
- Fall of
- Republic of

- Russia, History of

- Tsardom
- Empire
- Revolution (1917)
- USSR
- post-Soviet Russia

- Rwanda, History of

== S ==
- Science, History of
- Scotland, History of
- Scramble for Africa
- Serbia, History of
- Slavery, History of
- Social history
- Socialism, History of
- Source, Primary
- Source, Secondary
- South Africa, History of
- South America, History of
- South India, History of
- Space Age
- Spain, History of

- Empire of
- Civil War

- Sport, History of
- Stone Age
- Sweden, History of
- Switzerland, History of
- Syria, History of

== T ==
- Taiping Revolution
- Telecommunication, History of
- Thailand, History of
- Three-age system
- Trade, History of
- Transport, History of
- Turkey, History of

== U ==
- Uganda, History of
- Ukraine, History of
- United States, History of
  - Diplomatic history
  - Military history
  - Technological and industrial history
  - Economic history
  - Cultural history
  - Women's history
  - Native American history
  - Timeline
    - Pre-Columbian era
    - Colonial period
    - American Revolutionary War
    - 1776–1789
    - 1789–1849
    - 1849–1865
    - 1865–1918
    - 1918–1945
    - 1945–1964
    - 1964–1980
    - 1980–1991
    - 1991–present
- United Kingdom, History of
- Universal history
- Uruguay, History of
- USSR, History of the
- Uzbekistan, History of

== V ==
- Vanuatu, History of
- Vatican City, History of
- Venezuela, History of
- Venice, History of
- Vietnam, History of

- American War

- Vikings
- Viking Age

== W ==
- War
- Warfare, Ancient
- Western fashion, History of
- Wildlife tracking technology, History of
- Women's history
- World history
- World War I
- World War II (Outline of World War II)
- Writing, History of

== X ==
- Xinhai Revolution

== Y ==
- Yemen, History of

== Z ==
- Zambia, History of
- Zanzibar, History of
- Zimbabwe, History of
