= Hagiopolitan Octoechos =

System of chanting in medieval Christian churches

Oktōēchos or Octoechos (Greek: ὁ Ὀκτώηχος pronounced in koine: okˈtóixos; from ὀκτώ 'eight' and ἦχος 'sound, mode' called echos; Slavonic: Осмогласие, Osmoglasie from о́смь 'eight' and гласъ 'voice, sound') is the name of the eight mode system used for the composition of religious chant in most Christian churches during the Middle Ages. In a modified form, the octoechos is still regarded as the foundation of the tradition of monodic Orthodox chant today (Neobyzantine Octoechos).

The octoechos as a liturgical concept which established an organization of the calendar into eight-week cycles, was the invention of monastic hymnographers at Mar Saba in Palestine, at the Patriarchates of Antiochia and of Constantinople. It was officially announced as the modal system of hymnography at the Quinisext Council in 692.

A similar eight-mode system was established in Western Europe during the Carolingian reform, and particularly at the Second Council of Nicaea in 787 AD which decanonised the former iconoclastic council in 754 and confirmed earlier ones. Quite possibly this was an attempt to follow the example of the Eastern Church by an octoechos reform, even if it was rather a transfer of knowledge with an introduction of a new book called "tonary" which introduced into a Western octoechos of its own design.

It had a list of incipits of chants ordered according to the intonation formula of each tone in its psalmody. Later on, fully notated and theoretical tonaries were also written. The Byzantine book octoechos (9th century) was one of the first hymn books with musical notation and its earliest surviving copies date from the 10th century.

== Origins ==
Students of Orthodox chant today often study the history of Byzantine chant in three periods, identified by the names John of Damascus (675/676-749) as the "beginning", John Koukouzeles (c. 1280–1360) as the "flower" (Papadic Octoechos), and Chrysanthos of Madytos (c. 1770-c. 1840) as the master of the living tradition today (Neobyzantine Octoechos). The latter has the reputation that he once connected in his time the current tradition with the past of Byzantine chant, which was in fact the work of at least four generations of teachers at the New Music School of the Patriarchate.

This division of the history into three periods begins quite late with the 8th century, despite the fact that the octoechos reform was already accepted some decades earlier, before John and Cosmas entered the monastery Mar Saba in Palestine. The earliest sources which gave evidence of the octoechos' use in Byzantine chant, can be dated back to the 6th century.

=== Jerusalem, Alexandria, or Constantinople ===
The common schedule and the focus on the circle around John of Damascus is confirmed by a ninth-century treatise called Hagiopolites (from hagia polis [ἡ ἁγία πόλις], "Holy City", referring to Jerusalem) which only survived in a complete form as a late copy. The Hagiopolites treatise served presumably as an introduction of a book called tropologion—a 9th-century chant book which had been replaced soon by the book octoechos, as part of the sticherarion one of the first chant books fully provided with musical notation. The Hagiopolitan emphasis on John of Damascus was obviously the late result of a 9th-century redaction around the Second Council of Nicaea in 787, so it was part of the later Stoudites' reform between Jerusalem and Constantinople and it was motivated theologically, not only because of his contributions to the tropologion, but also because of the keyrole which John of Damascus' polemic against the iconoclasts had during this council.

Nevertheless, the theological and liturgical concept of an eight-week cycle can be traced back to the cathedral rite of Jerusalem during the 5th century, and originally it was the Christian justification of Sunday as the eighth day after Sabbat. Peter Jeffery assumed a first phase during which the concept existed independently in various places, and a second phase during which Palestine became the leading centre of a monastic hymn reform. It established reform models which were also used later by the generation of John of Damascus. Despite that the first paragraph of the Hagiopolites ascribes the treatise to John of Damascus, it was probably written about 100 years after his death and went through several redactions during the following centuries.

There is no doubt that the octoechos reform itself had already taken place by 692, because certain passages of the Hagiopolites paraphrase certain law texts (the canons of the synodal decree). Eric Werner assumed that the eight-mode system developed in Jerusalem since the late fifth century and that the reform by the hymnographers of Mar Saba were already a synthesis with the Ancient Greek names used for the tropes, applied to a model of Syrian origin already used in the Byzantine tradition of Jerusalem. During the eighth century, long before Ancient Greek treatises were translated into Arabic and Persian dialects between the ninth and the tenth centuries, there was already a great interest among theorists like Abū Yūsuf al-Kindī, whose Arabic terms were obviously translated from the Greek. He adored the universality of the Greek octoechos:

Sämtliche Stile aller Völker aber haben Teil an den acht byzantinischen Modi (hiya min al-alhān at-tamāniya ar-rūmīya), die wir erwähnt haben, denn es gibt nichts unter allem, was man hören kann, das nicht zu einem von ihnen gehörte, sei es die Stimme eines Menschen oder eines anderen Lebewesens, wie das Wiehern eines Pferdes oder das Schreien eines Esels oder das Krähen des Hahns. Alles, was an Formen des Schreis einem jeden Lebewesen/Tier eigen ist, ist danach bekannt, zu welchem Modus der acht es gehört, und es ist nicht möglich, daß es sich außerhalb eines von ihnen [bewegt].

Every style of any tribe takes part of the Byzantine eight tones (hiya min al-alhān at-tamāniya ar-rūmīya) which I mentioned here. Everything which can be heard, be it the human or be it the animal voice – like the neighing of a horse, the braying of a donkey, or the carking of a cock, can be classified according to one of the eight modes, and it is impossible to find anything outside of the eight mode system.

— Al-Kindi

Al-Kindi demonstrated the intervals on the keyboard of a simple four-stringed oud, starting from the third string as well seven steps in ascending as in descending direction.

According to Eckhard Neubauer, there is another Persian system of seven advār ("cycles"), outside the Arabic reception of the Byzantine octoechos, which was possibly a cultural transfer from Sanskrit treatises. Persian and Ancient Greek sources had been the main reference for the transfer of knowledge in Arabian-Islamic science.

=== Monastic reform of Mar Saba ===
According to the Hagiopolites the eight echoi ("modes") were divided in four kyrioi (authentic) echoi and their four respective plagioi (enriched, developed) echoi, which were all in the diatonic genus.

==== 8 diatonic echoi of the Hagiopolitan Octoechos ====
Despite the late copies of the Greek Hagiopolites treatise, the earliest Latin description of the Greek system of eight echoi is an eleventh-century treatise compilation called Alia musica. Echos was translated as sonus by the anonymous compilator who commented with a comparison of the Byzantine octoechos:

Quorum videlicet troporum, sive etiam sonorum, primus graeca lingua dicitur Protus; secundus Deuterus; tertius Tritus; quartus Tetrardus: qui singuli a suis finalibus deorsum pentachordo, quod est diapente, differunt. Superius vero tetrachordum, quod est diatessaron, requirunt, ut unusquisque suam speciem diapason teneat, per quam evagando, sursum ac deorsum libere currat. Cui scilicet diapason plerumque exterius additur, qui emmelis, id est, aptus melo vocatur.

Sciendum quoque, quod Dorius maxime proto regitur, similiter Phrygius deutero, Lydius trito, mixolydius tetrardo. Quos sonos in quibusdam cantilenis suae plagae quodammodo tangendo libant, ut plaga proti tangat protum, deuteri deuterum, triti tritum, tetrardi tetrardum. Et id fas est experiri in gradalibus antiphonis.

It is known about the tropes, as to say: the ἦχοι, that the Greek language call the First πρῶτος, the Second δεύτερος, the Third τρίτος, the Fourth τέταρτος. Their Finales were separated by a pentachord, that is: a falling fifth (gr. diapente) [between kyrios and plagios]. And above [the pentachord] they require a tetrachord, that is: a fourth (gr. diatessaron), so that each of them has its octave species, in which it can move freely, rambling down and up. For the full octave (gr. diapason) another tone might be added, which is called ὁ ἐμμελής: "according to the melos".

It has to be known that the "Dorian" [octave species] is usually ruling in the πρῶτος, as the "Phrygian" in the δεύτερος, the "Lydian" in the τρίτος, or the "Mixolydian" in the τέταρτος. Their πλάγιοι are derived by these ἦχοι in that way, that the formula touch them [going down a fifth]. Thus, the πλάγιος τοῦ πρώτου touch the πρῶτος, the plagal Second [πλάγιος τοῦ δευτέρου] the δεύτερος, the plagal Third [βαρύς] the τρίτος, the plagal Fourth [πλάγιος τοῦ τετάρτου] the τέταρτος. And this should be proved by the melodies of the antiphonal graduals [corresponding the Byzantine chant genre prokeimenon] as a divine law.

— Alia musica

This Latin description about the octoechos used by Greek singers (psaltes) is very precise, when it says that each kyrios and plagios pair used the same octave, divided into a fifth (pentachord) and a fourth (tetrachord): D—a—d in protos, E—b—e in devteros, F—c—f in tritos, and C—G—c in tetartos. While the kyrioi had the finalis (final, and usually also base note) on the top, the plagioi had the finalis on the bottom of the pentachord.

The intonation formulas, called enechema (gr. ἐνήχημα), for the authentic modes or kyrioi echoi, usually descend within the pentachord and turn back to the finalis at the end, while the plagal modes or plagioi echoi just move to the upper third. The later dialogue treatises (Gr. ἐρωταποκρίσεις, erotapokriseis) refer to the Hagiopolitan diatonic eight modes, when they use the kyrioi intonations to find those of the plagioi:

Περὶ πλαγίων

Ἀπο τοῦ πλαγίου πρώτου ἤχου πάλιν καταβαίνεις τέσσαρας φωνάς, καὶ εὑρίσκεται πάλιν πλάγιος πρώτου· ὅυτως δὲ / ἄνανε ἄνες ἀνὲ ἄνες·

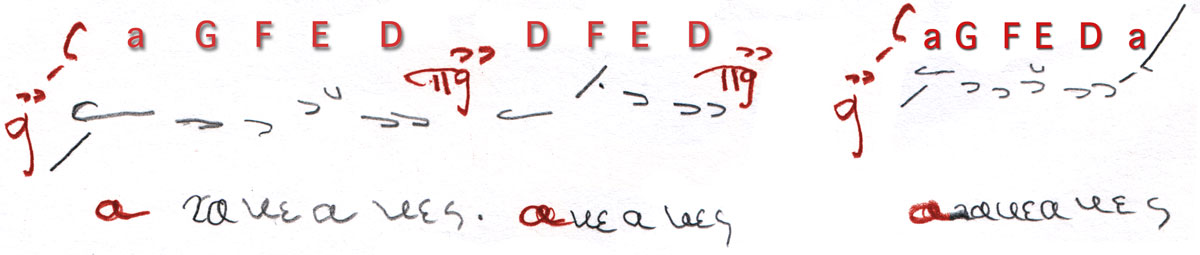
Intonation according to Erotapokriseis and standard intonation of echos protos: "You descend 4 steps [φοναὶ] from the echos protos [kyrios protos/authentic protus] and you will find again the plagios protos, this way"

Ὁμοίως καὶ ὁ β' ἤχος καταβαίνων φωνάς δ', εὑρίσκεις τὸν πλάγιον αὐτοῦ, ἤγουν τὸν πλάγιον τοῦ δευτέρου. πλ Β οὕτως δέ.

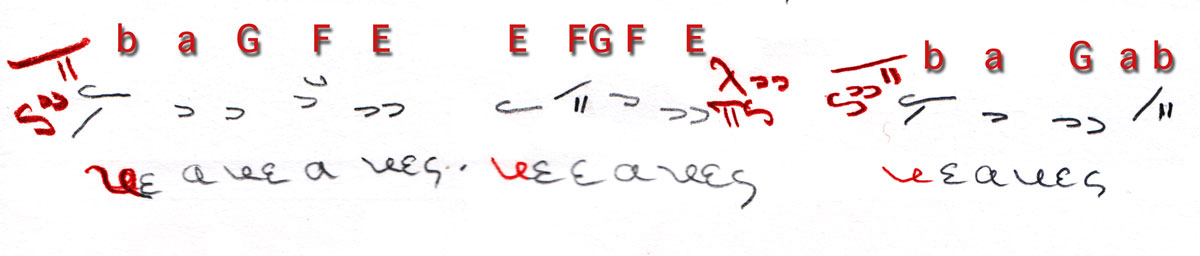
Intonation according to Erotapokriseis and standard intonation of echos devteros: "You do the same way in echos devteros. If you descend 4 steps to find its plagios, i.e. πλ β', thus"

Ὁμοίως πάλιν ὁ τρίτος καταβαίνεις φωνὰς τέσσαρας, καὶ εὑρίσκεται ὁ πλάγιος αὐτοῦ, ἤγουν ὁ βαρύς, οὕτως·

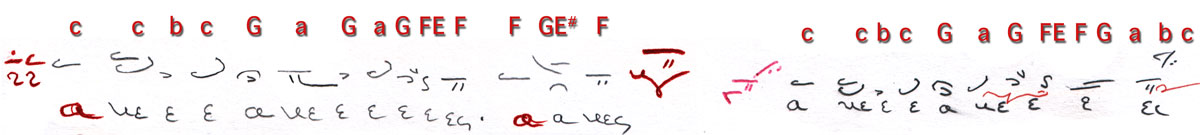
Intonation according to Erotapokriseis and standard intonation of echos tritos: "Hence, you descend four steps from echos tritos and you will find its plagios which is called 'grave' (βαρύς), this way"

Ὁμοίως καὶ ἀπὸ τὸν τέταρτον καταβαίνων φωνὰς τέσσαρας, εὑρίσκεις τὸν πλάγιον αὐτοῦ, ὡς ἐστὶ ὁ πλ δ'οὕτως·

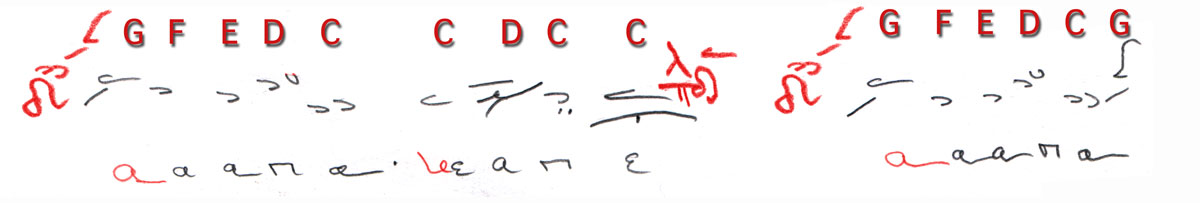
Intonation according to Erotapokriseis and standard intonation of echos tetartos: "Also from echos tetartos you descend 4 steps [φοναὶ] and you will find its plagios, which is πλ δ', like this way"

==== Phthorai of Hagios Sabbas and Hagia Sophia ====
The Hagiopolites as "earliest" theoretical treatise said, that two additional phthorai ("destroyers") were like proper modes which did not fit into the diatonic octoechos system, so the Hagiopolitan octoechos was in fact a system of 10 modes. But the chronology of definitions concerned about two phthorai regarded them first as modes of their own because of their proper melos and that their models had to be sung during the eight-week cycle. These mesoi ("medial echoi") of tetartos and protos, with a finalis and base between kyrios and plagios, were obviously favoured by hymnographers like John of Damascus and his step-brother Kosmas, while the concept of a transition between echoi was established later:

φθοραὶ δὲ ὠνομασθήσαν, ὅτι ἐκ τῶν ἰδίων ἤχων πᾶρχονται, τελειοῦνται δὲ εἰς ἑτέρων ἤχων φθογγὰς αἱ θέσεις αὐτῶν καὶ τὰ ποτελέσματα.

They were called Phthorai (i.e. destroyers), because they begin from their own Echoi, but the thesis of their cadences and formulas are on notes (phthongoi) from other Echoi.

— Hagiopolites (§34)

It seems that the concept of the eight diatonic echoi was established by the generation of Theodore the Studite and his brother Joseph, but they had two integrate other melē passing through other genera than the diatonic one as they had been favoured by protagonists of the Sabbaite school:

Ἤχους δὲ [λέγουσιν] ἐν τούτῳ ὀκτὼ ψάλλεσθαι. ἔστι δὲ τοῦ το ἀπ[οβλητέον καὶ] ψευδές· ὁ γὰρ πλάγιος δευτέρου ὡς ἐπὶ τὸ πλεῖστο[ν έσος] δεύτερος ψάλλεται, ὡς τὸ «Νίκην ἔχων Χριστὲ» [καὶ ὡς τὸ «Σ]ὲ τὸν ἐπὶ ὑδάτων» καὶ ἄλλα ὅσα πα[ρὰ τοῦ κυροῦ Κοσμᾶ] καὶ τοῦ κυροῦ Ἰωάννου τοῦ Δαμασκ[ηνοῦ ἀπὸ τῆς μουσικῆς] ἐξ[ε]τέθησαν — ὅσα δὲ [ἐποιήθυσαν ὑπὸ τοῦ κυρ]οῦ [Ἰ]ωσὴφ [καὶ] ἄλλ[ων] τ[ινῶν, ε]ἰ δο[κιμάσεις αὐτὰ μετὰ τῆς μουσικῆς ψάλλειν, οὐκ ἰσάζουσι διὰ τὸ μὴ ἐκτεθῆναι ὑπ’ αὐτῆς — ὁμοίως δὲ καὶ ὁ πλάγιος τετάρτου ὡς ἐπὶ τὸ πλεῖστον μέσος τέταρτος ψάλλεται, ὡς] ἐπὶ τὸ «Σταυρὸν χαράξας Μωσῆς» καὶ ἕτερα οὐκ ὀλίγα. ἔστιν οὖκ ἐκ τούτων γνῶναι, ὅτι οὐκ ὀκτὼ μόνοι ψάλλονται ἀλλὰ δέκα.

For the songs in this book eight Echoi are said to be necessary. But this is not true and should be rejected. In fact the Plagios of Deuteros is mostly sung as Mesos Deuteros—e.g. «Νίκην ἔχων Χριστὲ», the «Σὲ τὸν ἐπὶ ὑδάτων» and other pieces written by Master Cosmas and Master John of Damascus “from the Mousike”. (If, however, you try to sing the compositions of Master Joseph and others “with the Mousike”, they will not fit, having not been composed “according to it”). Similarly the Plagios of Tetartos is mostly sung as Mesos Tetartos like over «Σταυρὸν χαράξας Μωσῆς» and many others. For these cases we can see that ten Echoi are used (for the repertory of this book) and not eight, only.

— Hagiopolites (§2)

The later Papadikai mention that changes between the echos tritos and the echos plagios tetartos were bridged by the enharmonic phthora nana, and changes between the echos protos and the echos plagios devteros by the chromatic phthora nenano.

Nevertheless, the terminology of the Hagiopolites somehow suggested that nenano and nana as phthorai "destroy" one or two diatonic degrees used within one tetrachord of a certain echos, so that the chromatic and enharmonic genera were somehow subordinated and excluded from the diatonic octoechos. This raises the question, when the music in the near eastern Middle Ages became entirely diatonic, since certain melodies were coloured by the other enharmonic and chromatic gene according to the school of Damascus. This is the question about the difference between the Hagiopolitan reform of 692 and in as much it was opposed to the Constantinopolitan tradition and its own modal system.

The author of the Hagiopolites mentioned an alternative system of 16 echoi "sung in the Asma," with 4 phthorai and 4 mesoi beyond the kyrioi and plagioi of the diatonic octoechos:

Οἱ μὲν οὖν τέσσαρρεις πρῶτοι οὐκ ἐξ ἄλλων τινων ἀλλ'ἐξ αὐτῶν γινονται. οἱ δὲ τέσσαρεις δεύτεροι, ἤγουν οἱ πλάγιοι, ὁ μὲν πλάγιος πρῶτος ἐκ τῆς ὑπορροῆς τοῦ πρώτου γέγονε. καὶ ἀπὸ τῆς ὑπορροῆς τοῦ πληρώματος τοῦ δευτέρου γέγονεν ὁ πλάγιος δευτέρου· ὡς ἐπὶ τὸ πλεῖστον δὲ καὶ τὰ πληρώματα τοῦ δευτέρου [εἰς τὸν πλάγιον δευτέρου] τελειοῖ. ὁ βαρὺς ὁμοίως καὶ ἀπὸ τοῦ τρίτοῦ· καὶ γὰρ εἰς τὸ ἆσμα ἡ ὑποβολὴ τοῦ βαρέως τρίτος ψάλλεται ἅμα τοῦ τέλους αὐτοῦ. καὶ ἀπὸ τοῦ τετάρτου γέγονεν ὁ πλάγιος τέταρτος. καὶ ἀπὸ τῶν τεσσάρων πλαγίων ἐγεννήθησαν τέσσαρεις μέσοι· καὶ ἀπ'αὐτῶν αἱ τέσσαρες φθοραί. καί ἀνεβιβάσθησαν ἦχοι ις', οἵτινες ψάλλονται εἰς τὸ ἆσμα, οἱ δὲ δέκα ὡς προείπομεν εἰς τὸν Ἁγιοπολίτην.

The 4 [authentic] Echoi which come first are generated from themselves, not from others. As to the four which come next, i.e. the Plagal ones, Plagios Prōtos is derived from Prōtos, and Plagios Deuteros from Deuteros – normally Deuteros melodies end in Plagios Deuteros. Similarly, Barys [the plagal Third] from Tritos – "for in the Asma Hypobole of Barys is sung as Tritos together with its ending". From the 4 Plagioi originate the 4 Mesoi, and from these the 4 Phthorai. This makes up the 16 Echoi which are sung in the Asma – as already mentioned, there are sung only 10 [8 diatonic Echoi and 2 Phthorai called after the names of their enechemata νανὰ and νενανῶ] in the Hagiopolites.

— Hagiopolites (§6)

These "echoi of the Asma" did probably point at the rite at the Patriarchal church or even at the cathedral rite of Constantinople which was also known as "choral" or "sung rite" (ἀκολουθία ᾀσματική). The Constantinopolitan chant books were called asmatikon ("book of the choir"), psaltikon ("book of the soloist called 'monophonares'"), and kontakarion (another name of the psaltikon, since the huge collection of kontakia, sung during the morning service, was its largest part).

Unfortunately, no early Constantinopolitan chant manual survived, there is only this short paragraph of the Hagiopolites which says, that the singers of the choir followed in their chant books an own modal system, which was distinct from the Hagiopolitan octoechos. A distinction from Constantinople is not the only possible explanation, because Jerusalem had also its own local cathedral rite. Since the 14th century at latest, the monastic rite was not opposed to the cathedral rite, even monks celebrated it on festival occasions, whenever they expected guests.

The earliest sources are those of the Slavic reception of Constantinople which can be dated back not earlier than to the 12th century, and they used a system of 12 church tones called glas'. The earliest treatises which mention a modal system, is not a chant manual, but a corpus of alchemic treatises, which testifies a modal system of 24 "elements" (στοιχεῖα) or "aims" (στοχοὶ):

Ὥσπερ δὲ τεσσάρων ὄντων μουσικῶν γενικωτάτων στοχῶν, Α Β Γ Δ, γίνονται παρ῾ αὐτῶν τῷ εἴδει διάφοροι στοχοὶ κδ´, κέντροι καὶ ἶσοι καὶ πλάγιοι, καθαροί τε καὶ ἄηχοι <καὶ παράηχοι> · καὶ ἀδύνατον ἄλλως ὑφανθῆναι τὰς κατὰ μέρος ἀπείρους μελῳδίας τῶν ὕμνων ἣ θεραπειῶν, ἤ ἄποκαλύψεων, ἤ ἄλλου σκέλους τῆς ἱερᾶς ἐπιστήμης, καὶ οἷον ῥεύσεως ἤ φθορᾶς ἤ ἄλλων μουσικῶν παθῶν ἐλευθέρας,

As there are 4 basic elements/targets [earth, water, air, and fire] which created their music, the πρῶτος, the δεύτερος, the τρίτος, and the τέταρτος, and by their formulas the same generate 24 different elements: the [4] κέντροι (central), [4] ἶσοι (basic), and [4] πλάγιοι (plagal), the [4] καθαροί (kathartic), [4] ἄηχοι (aphonic), and [4] παράηχοι (paraphonic). Hence, it is impossible to create something outside those infinite melodies of hymns, treatments, revelations, and of other parts of the Holy Wisdom, which is free from the irregularities and corruptions of other musical emotions (πάθη).

— Alchemy treatise

In the edition of the treatise by Otto Gombosi, the four "elements" (α', β', γ', δ') were associated with certain colours—πρῶτος with black (all colours together), δεύτερος with white (no colour at all), τρίτος with yellow (an elementary colour), and τέταρτος with purple (a combination of elementary colours). These passages could be easily compiled with Zosimos of Panopolis' treatise about the process of bleaching.

The system favoured 3 four tetrachord sets (either modes by themselves or simply degree of the modes with different functions), called κέντροι, ἷσοι, and πλάγιοι. Kέντρος would be probably an early name for μέσος, if it lay between the ἶσος and πλάγιος, it could be as well used as an early name for κύριος ἦχος, because it is mentioned here first, while ἶσος could mean "equivalent", or just basis notes.

The exact point of reference concerning this 24 mode system was not clarified in the treatise, but it is evident, that there was a canonised wisdom which was connected with an ethical doctrine excluding certain passions (πάθη, pathe) as corruptions. Inside this wisdom, there was a Neoplatonic concept of an ideal and divine existence, which can be found and classified according to a modal scheme based on four elements. The term "element" (στοχείον) was less meant as a technical term or modal category, it was rather an alchemistic interpretation of the 24 musical modes.

In comparison, the Hagiopolitan terminology already included the "corruption" (φθορά) as an acceptable modal category in itself, which was neither excluded in the Hagiopolitan Octoechos nor in the modal system of a certain cathedral rite, which was made of 16 echoi. On the other hand, the described system, whether it meant 24 echoi including 12 pathologic echoi, called "aechoi" and "paraechoi", and associated with 4 "katharoi" or just cadential degrees or other modal functions. It is not clear, whether the latter name was simply meant in a geographical or ethnical way or whether it was here connected with a kind of music therapy which included certain pathe as a kind of antidote. Medical treatises of the Mediterranean had been developed later on by the association of melodic modes with 4 elements and 4 humours.

== Latin reception ==
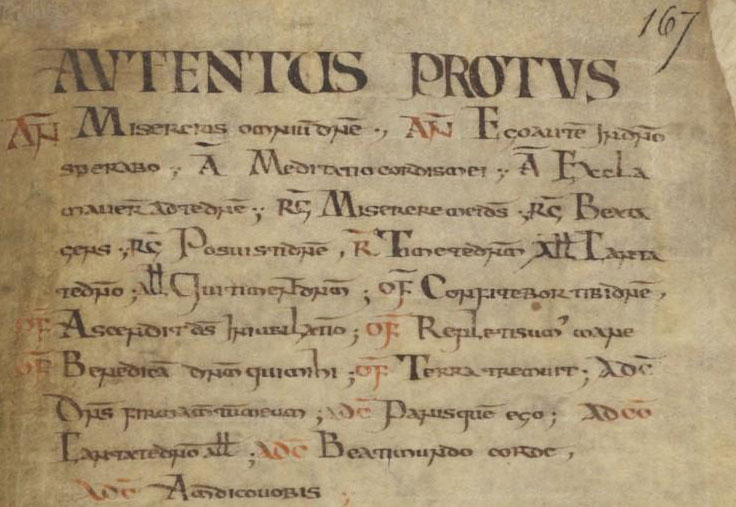
The earliest tonary: the fragment of Saint-Riquier in the Psalter of Charlemagne (F-Pn lat. Ms. 13159, fol. 167r)

The introduction of the eight mode system in Western chant traditions was part of the Carolingian reform. Officially, it was motivated by Pope Adrian I's confirmation of an earlier Eastern chant reform during the synode in 787, during which he accepted the reform for the Western traditions as well. Nevertheless, a Carolingian interest for the Byzantine octoechos can already be dated back to a visit some years earlier, when a Byzantine legacy introduced a series of antiphons sung during a procession for Epiphany. These antiphons served as a model for the eight modes according to the Hagiopolitan system.

The contemporary invention of a proper Latin version of the eight mode system was mainly studied from two perspectives:

- the reception of Ancient Greek music theory since Boethius and the synthesis between music theory as a science and a liberal art of the mathematic Quadrivium on the one hand, and as a medium of chant transmission on the other hand. The eight church tones were called after the names of octave species, which were not connected with modal patterns and plainchant theory in Ancient Greek music theory.
- the simplification of chant transmission by a Western manuscript type called tonary which allowed the transfer of a huge chant repertoire like the Roman one, but also its deductive modal classification which changed the oral transmission of chant entirely.

=== Synthesis in Latin music theory ===
Latin theorists who knew the Hellenic tropes only through Boethius' 6th-century creative translation of Claudius Ptolemy's Books of Harmonics (Ἁρμονικῶν βιβλία, Harmonikōn biblia) tried to apply Ancient Greek music theory to the octoechos as a system of eight church tones, identified with the tropes of Antique music theory. The synthesis had not been done earlier than during the Carolingian reform (usually dated according to Charlemagne's admonitio generalis which was decreed in 789), before music theory as science was strictly separated from chant transmission and the cantor as a profession dedicated to church music.

The terms tropus (transposition octave) and modus (the octave species defined by the position of the tonus, the whole tone with the proportion of 9:8, and the semitonium, the half tone with the proportion of 256:243), were taken from Boethius' translation. But the Antique names of the seven modi were applied to the eight church tones called toni. The first attempt to connect Ancient Greek music theory (as expressed in Boethius) and the theory of plainchant can be found in the treatise De harmonica institutione ("On the foundation of harmonics") by Hucbald of Saint-Amand Abbey, written by the end of the 9th century, when the author addressed his treatise explicitly to cantors and not to mathematicians, whereas the reduction of 4 finales which made up the tetrachord D—E—F—G, was already done in Carolingian times in the treatises Musica and Scolica enchiriadis. Musica enchiriadis is also the only Latin treatise which testifies to the presence of a tetraphonic tone system, represented by 4 Dasia-signs and therefore called "Dasia system", and even the practical use of transposition (metabolē kata tonon) in plainchant, called absonia. Its name probably derived from sonus, the Latin term for ἦχος, but in the context of this treatise the use of absonia is reserved to define transposition as something out of the expected context of a tone system. Thus, the Dasia-system was only used to explain a primitive form of polyphony or heterophony, rather than serving as a precise description of transposition in monodic chant, as it was used in certain genres of Byzantine chant.

Hucbald used an idiosyncratic Greek letter system which referred to the double octave system (bisdiapason) of the systēma teleion known by Boethius' Ptolemy translation. Thus, he called the four elements known as "finales" according to the names of the Greek system:

Phthongoi and tone symbols of the finales
Tetrachord	Greek	Transliteration	Hucbaldian	=	Guidonian	Tonus
protus	λιχανὸς ὑπάτων	"lychanos hypaton"	F	=	D	I & II
deuterus	ὑπάτη μέσων	"hypate meson"	σ	=	E	III & IV
tritus	παρυπάτη μέσων	"parypate meson"	ρ	=	F	V & VI
tetrardus	λιχανὸς μέσων	"lychanos meson"	Μ	=	G	VII & VIII

Lycanos ypaton scilicet autentum protum· & plagis eiusdem· id est primum & secundum; Hypate mesonʕ autentum deuterum· & plagis eiusʕ iii & iiii· Parypate mesonʕ autentum tritum & plagis eiusʕ id est v· & vi. Lycanos mesonʕ autentum tetrardum. & plagis eiusʕ id est vii· & viii. Ita ut ad aliquam ipsarum ·quatuor. quamvis ul[tra] citraque variabiliter circumacta necessario omnis quaecumque fuerit redigatur· cantilena· Unde et e[a]edem finales appellatae quod finem in ipsis cuncta quae canuntur accipiant.

Λιχανὸς ὑπάτων [D] is [the φθόγγος of] the autentus protus and its plagal which are [tonus] I and II, ὑπάτη μέσων [E] of the autentus deuterus and its plagal which are [tonus] III and IV, παρυπάτη μέσων [F] of the autentus tritus and its plagal which are [tonus] V and VI, λιχανὸς μέσων [G] of the autentus tetrardus and its plagal which are [tonus] VII and VIII, for the reason, that these four very present ones surround necessarily each sung melody, so that they, however they might be, can be reduced to them. These four [φθόγγοι] are called "finales", since in all those [melodies] which are sung, they are perceived as their end.

— Hucbald of Saint-Amand De harmonica institutione

According to the Latin synthesis the plagal and authentic tones of protus, deuterus, tritus, and tetrardus did not use the same ambitus as in the Hagiopolitan octoechos, but authentic and plagal tones used both the finalis of the plagios, so that the finalis of the kyrios, the fifth degree of the mode, was no longer used as finalis, but as repercussa: the recitation tone of the authentic tone used in a simple form of psalmody which was another genuine invention by the Carolingian reformers. The ambitus of the authentic tones was made up the same way as used in the Greek octoechos, while the plagal tones used a lower ambitus: not the tetrachord above the pentachord, but below it. Hence, the hypodorian octave referred the tonus secundus and was constructed A—D—a, and the dorian as "tonus primus" D—a—d, both tones of the protus used D as finalis, the hypophrygian octave species was B—E—b and was the ambitus of the tonus quartus, and the phrygian octave species E—b—e was related to the tonus tertius and its finalis E belonged to the deuterus, the hypolydian octave species C—F—c was connected with the tonus sixtus, the lydian octave F—c—f with the tonus quintus and both shared the finalis F called tritus, the last was the seventh octave species G—d—g called "mixolydian" which referred to the tonus septimus and its finalis G.

=== Tonary ===
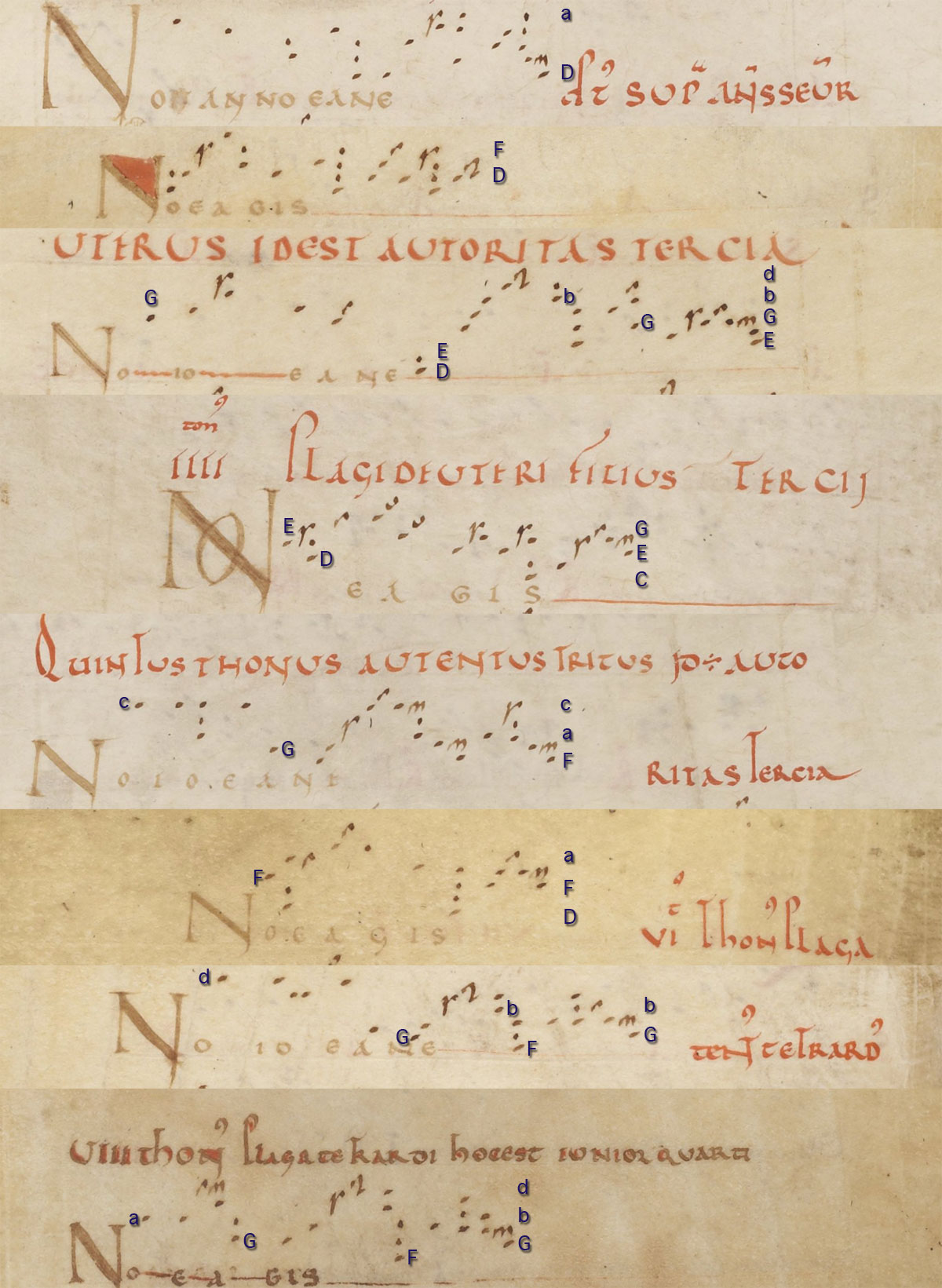
The intonation formulas for the 8 tones according to the Aquitanian tonary of Adémar de Chabannes (F-Pn lat. Ms. 909, fol. 251r-254r)

The earliest chant theory connected with the Carolingian octoechos was related to the book tonary. It played a key role in memorising chant and the earliest tonaries referred to the Greek names as elements of a tetrachord: πρῶτος, δεύτερος, τρίτος, and τέταρτος. They were translated into Latin as "protus", "deuterus", "tritus", and "tetrardus", but only the tetrachord D—E—F—G was supposed to contain the finales ("final notes") for the eight tones used in the Latin octoechos. Since the 10th century the eight tones were applied to eight simplified models of psalmody, which soon adopted in their terminations the melodic beginnings of the antiphons, which were sung as refrains during psalm recitation. This practice made the transitions smoother, and in the list of the antiphons which can be found since the earliest tonaries, it was enough to refer to the melodic beginnings or incipits of the text. In the earliest tonaries no models of psalmody had been given and incipits from all chant genres were listed, probably just for a modal classification (see the section for the Autentus protus of the Saint Riquier tonary).

According to Michel Huglo, there was a prototype tonary which initiated the Carolingian reform. But in a later study he mentioned an even earlier tonary which was brought as a present by a Byzantine legacy which celebrated procession antiphons for Epiphany in a Latin translation.

Already during the 10th century tonaries became so widespread in different regions, that they do not only allow to study the difference between local schools according to its modal classification, its redaction of modal patterns, and its own way of using Carolingian psalmody. They also showed a fundamental difference between the written transmission of Latin and Greek chant traditions, as it had developed between the 10th and 12th centuries. The main concern of Latin cantors and their tonaries was a precise and unambiguous classification of whatever melody type according to the local perception of the octoechos system.

Greek psaltes were not interested at all in this question. They knew the models of each modes by certain simple chant genres as the troparion and the heirmoi (the melodic models used to create poetry in the meter of the heirmologic odes), but other genres like sticheron and kontakion could change the echos within their melos, so their main interest was the relationship between the echoi to compose elegant and discrete changes between them.

In contrary, the very particular form and function of the tonary within chant transmission made it evident, that the modal classification of Latin cantors according to the eight tones of the Octoechos had to be done a posteriori, deduced by the modal analysis of the chant and its melodic patterns, while the transmission of the traditional chant itself did not provide any model except of the psalm tones used for the recitation of the psalms and the canticles.

The tonary was the very heart of the mainly oral chant transmission used during the Carolingian reform and as its medium it must have had a strong impact on the melodic memory of the cantors who used it in order to memorize the Roman chant, after a synode confirmed Charlemagne's admonitio generalis. The written transmission by fully notated chant manuscripts, the object of chant studies today, cannot be dated back to an earlier time than nearly 200 years after the admonitio—the last third of the 10th century. And it seems that Roman cantors whose tradition had to be learnt, followed at least 100 years later by the transcription of their chant repertory and no document has survived which can testify the use of tonaries among Roman cantors. Pope Adrian I's confirmation of the Eastern octoechos reform had probably no consequences on the tradition of Roman chant, which might be an explanation for the distinct written transmission, as it can be studied between Roman Frankish and Old Roman chant manuscripts.

The eight sections of the Latin tonary are usually ordered Tonus primus Autentus Protus, Tonus secundus Plagi Proti, Tonus tertius Autentus deuterus etc. Each section is opened by an intonation formula using the names like Noannoeane for the authentic and Noeagis for the plagal tones. In his theoretical tonary Musica disciplina Aurelian of Réôme asked a Greek about the meaning of the syllables, and reported that they had no meaning, they were rather an expression of joy as used by peasants to communicate with their working animals like horses. There was usually no exact resemblance of the Latin syllables to the names of the Greek intonations or enechemata which were identified with the diatonic kyrioi and plagioi echoi, but Aurelian's question made it obvious that the practice was taken from Greek singers. Unlike the Hagiopolitan octoechos, which used two additional phthorai with the syllables Nana and Nenano for changes into the enharmonic and chromatic genus, the enharmonic and chromatic genus was excluded from the Latin octoechos, at least according to Carolingian theorists.

Since the 10th century tonaries also include the mnemic verses of certain model antiphons which memorise each tone by one verse. The most common among all tonaries was also used by Guido of Arezzo in his treatise Micrologus: Primum querite regnum dei, Secundum autem simile est huic etc. Another characteristic was that melodic melisms called neumae followed the intonation formulas or mnemic verses. Usually they differed more among different tonaries than the preceding intonations or verses, but they all demonstrated the generative and creative aspect within chant transmission.

In comparison with Byzantine psaltes who always used notation in a more or less stenographic way, the exact patterns used during the so-called "thesis of the melos" (τὸ θέσις τοῦ μελοῦ) belonged to the oral tradition of a local school, its own modal system and its genre. But already the question of chant genre was connected with local traditions in medieval times and the point of reference for the psaltes who performed a certain genre: the Hagiopolitan octoechos and its genres (the odes according to the models of the heirmologion, the troparia of the book oktoechos (ἡ [βίβλος] ὀκτώηχος) or tropologion), or the Constantinopolitan cathedral rite (akolouthia asmatike) and its books asmatikon, psaltikon, and kontakarion might serve here as examples.

== Question of intervals and their transposition ==
The exact proportions which divided a tetrachord, had never been a subject of Greek medieval treatises concerned about Byzantine chant. The separation between the mathematical science harmonikai ("harmonics") and chant theory gave space to various speculations, even to the assumption that the same division was used as described in Latin music theory, operating with two diatonic intervals like tonus (9:8) and semitonium (256:243). Nevertheless, some treatises referred the tetrachord division into three intervals called the "major tone" (ὁ μείζων τόνος) which often corresponded to the prominent position of the whole tone (9:8), the "middle tone" (ὁ ἐλάσσων τόνος) between α and β, and the "small tone" (ὁ ἐλάχιστος τόνος) between β and γ which was usually a much larger interval than the half tone, and this division was common among most divisions by different ancient Greek theorists that were mentioned by Ptolemy in his Harmonics. Before Chrysanthos' Theoretika (the Eisagoge was simply an extract, while the Theoretikon mega was published by his student Panagiotes Pelopides), exact proportions were never mentioned in Greek chant theory. His system of 68 commata which is based on a corrupt use of arithmetics, can be traced back to the division of 12:11 x 88:81 x 9:8 = 4:3 between α and δ.

=== Pitches and their tonal system ===
Although Chrysanthos did not mention his name, the first who mentioned precisely these proportions starting from the open string of the third or middle chord of the oud, was the Arab theorist Al-Farabi in his Kitab al-Musiqa al-Kabir which was written during the first half of the 10th century. His explicit references to Persian and Ancient Greek music theory were possible, because they had been recently translated into Arabic and Persian dialects in the library of Baghdad. Thanks to them Al-Farabi had also an excellent knowledge of Ancient Greek music theory. The method of demonstrating the intervals by the frets of the oud keyboard was probably taken from Al-Kindi. Here the intervals are not referred to the Byzantine phthongoi, but to the name of the frets. And the fret corresponding to β was called "ring finger fret of Zalzal" (wuṣtā Zalzal), named after the famous Baghdadi oud player Zalzal. It seems that the proportion of the Zalzal fret was a refined one in Bagdad using a large middle tone that came very close to the interval of the small tone, while the Mawsili school used 13:12 instead of 12:11. There is no indication that this division had been of Byzantine origin, so Western scholars felt seduced to ascribe the use of the division called "soft diatonic" (to genos diatonikon malakon) and the chromaticism derived from it as an influence of the Ottoman Empire and to regard their view of the systēma teleion also as a norm for the Byzantine tonal system. As Phanariotes (Phanar or Fener was the Greek district of Istanbul with the residence of the Patriarchate) who composed as well in the makamlar, the teachers of the New Music School of the Patriarchate around Chrysanthos had certainly exchanges with Sephardic, Armenian, and Sufi musicians, but an intensive exchange between Byzantine, Arab and Persian musicians had already a history of more than 1000 years.

Unlike Latin treatises only a few Greek treatises of chant have survived and their authors wrote nothing about the intervals, about microtonal shifts as part of a certain melos and its echos, or about the practice of ison singing (isokratẽma). Nevertheless, these practices remained undisputed, because they are still part of the living tradition today, while Western plainchant became rediscovered during the 19th century. Neither musicians nor musicologists were longer familiar with them which explains why various descriptions, as they can be found in certain Latin treatises, were ignored for quite a long time.

Ancient Greek music theory had always been a point of reference in Latin chant treatises, something similar cannot be found in Greek chant treatises before the 14th century, but there were a few Latin treatises of the 11th century which did not only refer to Ancient music theory and the systēma teleion together with the Greek names of its elements, they even had parts dedicated to Byzantine chant. The appreciation for Byzantine chant is surprising, because there were very few authors except Boethius who had really studied Greek treatises and who were also capable to translate them.

The systēma teleion was present by the Boethian diagram which represented it for the diatonic, the chromatic, and the enharmonic genus. Several tonaries used letters which referred to the positions of this diagram. The most famous example is the letter notation of William of Volpiano which he developed for the Cluniac reforms by the end of the 10th century. In his school a unique tonary was already written, when he was reforming abbot of St. Benignus of Dijon. The tonary shows the Roman-Frankish mass chant written out in neume and letter notation. The repertory is classified according to the Carolingian tonary and its entirely diatonic octoechos. The use of tyronic letters for dieses clearly shows, that it was used as a kind of melodic attraction within the diatonic genus which sharpened the ditonus under the semitonium. Even in Guido of Arezzo's treatise Micrologus, at least in earlier copies, there is still a passage which explains, how the diesis can be found on the monochord. It shrinks the semitonium by replacing the usual whole tone (9:8) between re—mi (D—E, G—a, or a—b) by an even larger one in the proportion of 7:6 which was usually perceived as an attraction towards fa.

But there were as well other practices which could not be explained by the Boethian diagram and its use of tonus and semitonium. The authors of one theoretical tonary of the compilation called Alia musica used an alternative intonation with the name AIANEOEANE, the name was obviously taken from a Byzantine enechema ἅγια νεανὲς, a kind of Mesos tetartos with the finalis and basis on a low E, and applied the Byzantine practice to certain pieces of Roman-Frankish chant which were classified as tonus tertius or Autentus deuterus. In the following section De quarto tono the author quotes Aristoxenos' description of the enharmonic and chromatic division of the tetrachord, the remark on it in precisely this section had been probably motivated by the Hagiopolitan concept of the phthora nenano which connected the echos protos on a with the plagios devteros on E.

=== Medieval use of transposition (μεταβολὴ κατὰ τόνον) ===
Latin cantors knew about the theoretical concept of the practice of transposition since Boethius' translation of Ptolemy. Very few can be said, if they ever understood the practical use of it. Nevertheless, there was a rudimentary knowledge which can be found in the Carolingian treatises Musica and Scolica enchiriadis. The Musica enchiriadis was also the only Latin treatise which documented a second tone system beside the systẽma teleion, but it does not explain at all, how these both systems worked together in practice.

The Hagiopolites did neither explain it nor did it mention any tone system nor the metabolē kata tonon, but this was probably because the hymn reform of Jerusalem was mainly concerned with simple models exemplified by heirmoi or troparia. Greek protopsaltai used the transposition only in very few compositions of the stichẽrarion, for instance the compositions passing through all the modes of the octoechos, or certain melismatic elaborations of troparia in the psaltic style, the soloistic style of the Constantinopolitan cathedral rite. This might explain that Charles Atkinson discussed Carolingian theory in comparison with the later Papadikai, in which all possible transpositions were represented by the Koukouzelian wheel or by the kanõnion.

Wheels are also used in Arabic music theory since the 13th century, and Al-Farabi was the first who started a long tradition of science, which did not only find the proportions of the untransposed diatonic system on the oud keyboard, but also those of all possible transpositions. The use of instruments had to adapt to a very complex tradition which had probably been a rather vocal tradition in its origins.

== See also ==
- Papadic and Neobyzantine Octoechos
- Musical system of ancient Greece
- Byzantine Music—traditional music of the Byzantine Empire
- Protopsaltes (Domestikos, Lampadarios)—ranks of psaltes in charge of the Patriarchate

=== People ===
- Andrew of Crete—teacher of John of Damascus, and Cosmas of Maiuma and hymn reformer at Mar Saba (8th century)
- Joseph the Hymnographer—Sicilian Greek and hymn reformer at the Monastery of Stoudios (9th century)

== Sources ==
=== Greek chant treatises ===
- Pseudo-Zosimos (1887–88). Berthelot, Marcellin; Ruelle, Charles-Émile (eds.). Collection des anciens alchimistes grecs. Vol. 3. Paris: Georges Steinheil. p. 434.; quoted and translated into German: Gombosi, Otto (1940). "Studien zur Tonartenlehre des frühen Mittelalters. III". Acta Musicologica. 12 (1/4): 39–44. doi:10.2307/931952. JSTOR 931952.
- "Paris, Bibliothèque nationale, fonds grec, Ms. 360, ff.216r-237v", Βιβλίον ἁγιοπολίτης συγκροτημένον ἔκ τινων μουσικῶν μεθόδων [The book of the Holy Polis "Jerusalem" unifying different musical methods] in a compiled collection of basic grammar treatises and fragments with mathemataria and of a menologion (12th century), see the edition: Raasted, Jørgen, ed. (1983), The Hagiopolites: A Byzantine Treatise on Musical Theory (PDF), Cahiers de l'Institut du Moyen-Âge Grec et Latin, vol. 45, Copenhagen: Paludan.
- Bellermann, Johann Friedrich; Najock, Dietmar, eds. (1972), Drei anonyme griechische Traktate über die Musik, Göttingen: Hubert.
- Hannick, Christian; Wolfram, Gerda, eds. (1997), Die Erotapokriseis des Pseudo-Johannes Damaskenos zum Kirchengesang, Monumenta Musicae Byzantinae - Corpus Scriptorum de Re Musica, vol. 5, Vienna: Verlag der Österreichischen Akademie der Wissenschaften, ISBN 978-3-7001-2520-4.

=== Latin treatises and tonaries (6th–12th century) ===
- Boethius, Anicius Manlius Severinus. "Einsiedeln, Stiftsbibliothek, Cod. 358, pp. 144-270". «Institutionis musicae id est armonicae» with glossae maior copied at the scriptorium of Einsiedeln (10th century). Edition: Boethius, Anicius Manlius Severinus (1844–1904). "De institutione musica, liber IV". In Migne, Jacques-Paul (ed.). Patrologia cursus completus, series latina. Vol. 63. Paris: Garnier. pp. [col.1245–1286].
- "Valenciennes, Bibliothèque municipale (F-VAL) Ms. 337 (olim 325, 359), fol. 42v-79v". Musica and Scolica enchiriadis in the treatise collection of the Abbey Saint-Amand (10th century). Edition: Gerbert, Martin, ed. (1784). "Musica enchiriadis & Scholia enchiriadis de arte musica". Scriptores Ecclesiastici de Musica Sacra Potissimum. Vol. 1 (Hildesheim 1963 reprint ed.). St Blaise. pp. 152–212.
- Hucbald. "Prague, Národní knihovna (dríve Universitní knihovna), Ms. 273 olim XIX.C.26, fol. 19-28". Tonary "De harmonica institutione" with Lorrain neumes and Greek terminology in a treatise collection (ca. 1100). Edition: Gerbert, Martin, ed. (1784). "Ubaldi seu Hucbaldi Monachi Elnonensis opuscula de musica". Scriptores Ecclesiastici de Musica Sacra Potissimum. Vol. 1 (Hildesheim 1963 reprint ed.). St Blaise. pp. 103–125.
- Aurelian of Réôme. "Valenciennes, Bibliothèque municipale, Ms. 148, fol. 57-89". "Musica disciplina" with intonations in later added Paleofrankish neumes, Abbey Saint-Amand (ca. 880-885). Gallica. Edition: Gushee, Lawrence, ed. (1975). "Aureliani Reomensis Musica disciplina". Corpus scriptorum de musica. Vol. 21. Rome: American Institute of Musicology. pp. 35–135.
- "Prague, Národní knihovna (dríve Universitní knihovna), Ms. XIX.C.26, fol. 1-11". Tonary in red ink ("Primus igitur lydius...") of the "Ratio breviter super musicum cum tonario [fol. 4r]" with Lorrain neumes and Greek terminology (close to the "alia musica" compilation) in a treatise collection (ca. 1100).
- Berno of Reichenau. "St. Gallen, Stiftsbibliothek, Cod. Sang. 898, p. 2–25". "De consona tonorum diversitate" with tonary, in "Bernonis Epistolae cum sermonibus et hymnis", St. Gall Abbey, copy of a dedicated collection for King Henry III (11th century).
- Guido of Arezzo. "Paris, Bibliothèque Nationale, fonds lat., Ms. 7211, fol. 73'-89". Micrologus in a treatise collection from St-Pierre de Luxeuil (12th century). Edition: Guido of Arezzo (1784), "Micrologus", in Gerbert, Martin (ed.), Scriptores ecclesiastici de musica sacra potissimum, vol. 2 (Hildesheim 1963 reprint ed.), St Blaise: Typis San-Blasianis, pp. 2–24.
- Hartvic (copyist). "Munich, Bayerische Staatsbibliothek, Ms. Clm 14272, fol. 175-181". Theoretical tonary compilation alia musica (manuscript M) with neumed intonations, psalmody, and additional tonary rubrics from the Abbey St. Emmeram, Regensburg (1006-1028). Edition: Chailley, Jacques, ed. (1965), Alia musica (Traité de musique du IXe siècle): Édition critique commentée avec une introduction sur l'origine de la nomenclature modale pseudo-grecque au Moyen-Âge, Paris: Centre de documentation universitaire et Société d'édition d'enseignement supérieur réunis.
- "Paris, Bibliothèque Nationale, fonds lat., Ms. 7211, fol. 54-71". Tonary compilation "Alia musica" in a treatise collection from St-Pierre de Luxeuil (12th century). Edition: Gerbert, Martin, ed. (1784). "Alia musica". Scriptores ecclesiastici de musica sacra potissimum. Vol. 1 (Hildesheim 1963 reprint ed.). St Blaise: Typis San-Blasianis. pp. 125–152.

== Chant books with octoechos notation ==
=== Palaeo-Byzantine notation (10th–13th century) ===
- "Holy Mount Athos, Monastery of the Great Lavra, Ms. γ 12". Greek incomplete Triodion and Pentekostarion with Old Byzantine Chartres and Theta notation (10th century).
- "Sinai, Saint Catherine's Monastery, Ms. Gr. 1219". Greek Sticherarion with Old Byzantine Chartres notation (11th century).
- "Holy Mount Athos, Mone Vatopaidiou, Ms. 1488". Triodion, Pentekostarion and Oktoechos with Coislin (standard repertoire of the moveabe cycle) and Chartres notation (Oktoechos and apokryphs) (11th century). Library of Congress.
- "Paris, Bibliothèque nationale de France, fonds Coislin, ms. 220". Heirmologion in canon order (KaO) and prosomoia with developed Coislin notation (11th & 12th centuries).
- "Sinai, Saint Catherine's Monastery, Ms. Gr. 1217". Greek Sticherarion (only Menaion) with Old Byzantine Coislin notation (11th-12th century).
- "Moscow, Rossiysky Gosudarstvenny Archiv Drevnich Aktov (РГАДА), Fond 381 Ms. 152". Old Church Slavonic Sticherarion (Menaion from 1 September until 2 February) with znamenny notation (12th century).
- "Paris, Bibliothèque nationale, fonds grec, Ms. 356". Menaion fragment (October–July) written in developed Coislin notation (about 1200).
- "Mount Sinai, St. Catherine's Monastery, Ms. syr. 261". Syriac Sticherarion written in Coislin Notation from Saint Catherine's Monastery (13th century).

=== Latin chant books and notated tonaries ===
- "Paris, Bibliothèque Nationale de France, fonds. lat., Ms. 13159, fol. 167-167'". Tonaryfragment of St. Riquier in the "Psalter of Charlemagne" (ed. by Huglo 1971, 26-28).
- "Metz, Médiathèque, Ms. 351, fol. 66-76". Tonary of Metz (copied 878). 14 May 2008.
- "Laon, Bibliothèque municipale, Ms. 118, fol. A.1'-A.12'". Gradual-Sacramentary and Lectionary of the Abbey Saint-Denis (late 9th century).
- "Einsiedeln, Stiftsbibliothek, Ms. 121, p. 417-427". Psalmody of the Communiones in the Gradual and Notker's Sequentiary from the Einsiedeln Monastery (960-970).
- "Staatsbibliothek Bamberg, Msc.Lit.5, fol. 5-27". Tonary of Reichenau (copied 1001 in Reichenau).
- William of Volpiano. "Montpellier, Bibliothèque interuniversitaire Historique de Médecine, Ms. H159, pp.7-322". Toner-Gradual & fragment of an Antiphonary of the Abbey St. Bénigne in Dijon. Edition: Codex H. 159 de la Bibliothèque de l'École de médecine de Montpellier: Antiphonarium tonale missarum, XIe siècle. Paléographie musicale. Vol. 7–8. Solesmes: Abbaye Saint-Pierre de Solesmes. 1901–1905.
- "Paris, Bibliothèque Nationale, fonds lat., Ms. 1121". Troper, Sequentiary, and Tonary of St. Martial de Limoges, Adémar de Chabannes (11th century).
- "Paris, Bibliothèque Nationale, fonds lat., Ms. 909". Troper, Sequentiary, and Tonary of St. Martial de Limoges (11th century).
- "Paris, Bibliothèque Nationale, fonds lat., Ms. 1118". Troper, Tonary, Sequentiary and Proser from Southwestern France, Région d'Auch (11th century).

== Studies ==
- Alexandru, Maria (2000). Studie über die 'großen Zeichen' der byzantinischen musikalischen Notation unter besonderer Berücksichtigung der Periode vom Ende des 12. bis Anfang des 19. Jahrhunderts. University Copenhagen.
- Amargianakis, George (1977). "An Analysis of Stichera in the Deuteros Modes: The Stichera idiomela for the Month of September in the Modes Deuteros, Plagal Deuteros, and Nenano; transcribed from the Manuscript Sinai 1230 <A.D. 1365>" (PDF). Cahiers de l'Institut du Moyen-Âge Grec et Latin. 22–23: 1–269.
- Atkinson, Charles M. (2001). "Tonus in the Carolingian Era: A Terminal Spannungsfeld.". In Bernhard, Michael (ed.). Quellen und Studien zur Musiktheorie des Mittelalters (PDF). Munich: Verlag der Bayerischen Akademie der Wissenschaften. pp. 19–46. ISBN 978-3-76-966008-1.
- Atkinson, Charles M. (2008). The critical nexus: Tone-System, Mode, and Notation in Early Medieval Music. Oxford, New York [etc.]: Oxford University Press. ISBN 978-0-19-514888-6.
- Busse Berger, Anna Maria (2005), Medieval Music and the Art of Memory, Berkeley, Los Angeles: University of California Press, ISBN 978-0-19-514888-6.
- Chrysanthos of Madytos (1832), Θεωρητικὸν μεγὰ τῆς Μουσικῆς, Triest: Michele Weis.
- Floros, Constantin; Neil K. Moran (2009). The Origins of Russian Music - Introduction to the Kondakarian Notation. Frankfurt/Main etc.: Lang. ISBN 978-3-631-59553-4.
- Frøyshov, Stig Simeon R. (2007). "The Early Development of the Liturgical Eight-Mode System in Jerusalem". Saint Vladimir's Theological Quarterly. 51: 139–178.
- Gerlach, Oliver (2009). Im Labyrinth des Oktōīchos – Über die Rekonstruktion mittelalterlicher Improvisationspraktiken in liturgischer Musik. Vol. 2. Berlin: Ison. ISBN 9783000323065.
- Gerlach, Oliver (2012). "About the Import of the Byzantine Intonation Aianeoeane in an 11th Century Tonary". In Altripp, Michael (ed.). Byzanz in Europa. Europas östliches Erbe: Akten des Kolloquiums 'Byzanz in Europa' vom 11. bis 15. Dezember 2007 in Greifswald. Studies in Byzantine History and Civilization. Vol. 2. Turnhout: Brepols. pp. 172–183. doi:10.1484/M.SBHC_EB.1.100945. ISBN 978-2-503-54153-2.
- Hannick, Christian, ed. (1991). Rhythm in Byzantine Chant – Acta of the Congress held at Hernen Castle in November 1986. Hernen: Bredius Foundation.
- Huglo, Michel (1971), Les Tonaires: Inventaire, Analyse, Comparaison, Publications de la Société française de musicologie, vol. 2, Paris: Société française de musicologie.
- Huglo, Michel (2000), "Grundlagen und Ansätze der mittelalterlichen Musiktheorie", in Ertelt, Thomas; Zaminer, Frieder (eds.), Die Lehre vom einstimmigen liturgischen Gesang, Geschichte der Musiktheorie, vol. 4, Darmstadt: Wissenschaftliche Buchgesellschaft, pp. 17–102, ISBN 978-3-534-01204-6.
- Husmann, Heinrich (1970). "Die oktomodalen Stichera und die Entwicklung des byzantinischen Oktoëchos". Archiv für Musikwissenschaft. 27 (4): 304–325. doi:10.2307/930047. JSTOR 930047.
- Husmann, Heinrich; Jeffery, Peter (2001). "Syrian church music". Grove Music Online. doi:10.1093/gmo/9781561592630.article.27274. ISBN 978-1-56159-263-0.
- Jacobsthal, Gustav (1897). Die chromatische Alteration im liturgischen Gesang der abendländischen Kirche. Berlin: Springer.
- Jeffery, Peter (2001), "The Earliest Oktōēchoi: The Role of Jerusalem and Palestine in the Beginnings of Modal Ordering", The Study of Medieval Chant: Paths and Bridges, East and West; In Honor of Kenneth Levy, Woodbridge, Suffolk: Boydell Press, pp. 147–209, ISBN 978-0-85115-800-6.
- Jeffery, Peter (2001). "Oktōēchos". Grove Music Online. Oxford Music Online. doi:10.1093/gmo/9781561592630.article.50097. ISBN 978-1-56159-263-0.
- Makris, Eustathios (2005). "The Chromatic Scales of the Deuteros Modes in Theory and Practice". Plainsong and Medieval Music. 14: 1–10. doi:10.1017/S0961137104000075. ISSN 0961-1371. S2CID 162385479.
- Maloy, Rebecca (2009). "Scolica Enchiriadis and the 'non-Diatonic' Plainsong Tradition". Early Music History. 28: 61–96. doi:10.1017/S0261127909000369. S2CID 192197222.
- Manik, Liberty (1969). Das arabische Tonsystem im Mittelalter. Leiden: Brill.
- Lingas, Alexander (1999). "Performance Practice and the Politics of Transcribing Byzantine Chant" (PDF). Acta Musicae Byzantinae: Revista Centrului de Studii Bizantine Iaşi. 6: 56–76.
- Möller, Hartmut (1993). "Zur Frage der musikgeschichtlichen Bedeutung der ʻacademiaʼ am Hofe Karls des Großen: Die Musica Albini". In Frobenius, Wolf; Schwindt-Gross, Nicole; Sick, Thomas (eds.). Akademie und Musik. Erscheinungsweisen und Wirkungen des Akademiegedankens in Kultur- und Musikgeschichte: Institutionen, Veranstaltungen, Schriften. Festschrift für Werner Braun zum 65. Geburtstag, zugleich Bericht über das Symposium. Saarbrücker Studien zur Musikwissenschaft. Saarbrücken: Saarbrücker Druckerei und Verlag. pp. 269–288. ISBN 978-3-925036-82-8.
- Neubauer, Eckhard (1998), "Die acht "Wege" der arabischen Musiklehre und der Oktoechos – Ibn Misğah, al-Kindī und der syrisch-byzantinische oktōēchos", Arabische Musiktheorie von den Anfängen bis zum 6./12. Jahrhundert: Studien, Übersetzungen und Texte in Faksimile, Publications of the Institute for the History of Arabic-Islamic Science: The science of music in Islam, vol. 3, Frankfurt am Main: Inst. for the History of Arab.-Islamic Science, pp. 373–414.
- Neubauer, Eckhard (1990). "Arabische Anleitungen zur Musiktherapie". Zeitschrift für Geschichte der Arabisch-islamischen Wissenschaften. 6: 227–272.
- Phillips, Nancy (2000), "Notationen und Notationslehren von Boethius bis zum 12. Jahrhundert", in Ertelt, Thomas; Zaminer, Frieder (eds.), Die Lehre vom einstimmigen liturgischen Gesang, Geschichte der Musiktheorie, vol. 4, Darmstadt: Wissenschaftliche Buchgesellschaft, pp. 293–324, ISBN 978-3-534-01204-6.
- Pfisterer, Andreas (2002). Cantilena Romana: Untersuchungen zur Überlieferung des gregorianischen Chorals. Paderborn: Schöningh. ISBN 978-3-506-70631-7.
- Poliakova, Svetlana (June 2009). Sin 319 and Voskr 27 and the Triodion Cycle in the Liturgical Praxis in Russia during the Studite Period (PDF) (Thesis). Lissabon: Universidade Nova de Lisboa.
- Powers, Harold (2001). "Mode, § II Medieval Modal Theory, 1. The Elements, (ii) The Byzantine Model: oktōēchos". Grove Music Online. Oxford Music Online. doi:10.1093/gmo/9781561592630.article.43718.
- Raasted, Jørgen (1966). Intonation Formulas and Modal Signatures in Byzantine Musical Manuscripts. Monumenta Musicae Byzantinae, Subsidia. Vol. 7. Copenhagen: E. Munksgaard.
- Raasted, Jørgen (1988). "Die Jubili Finales und die Verwendung von interkalierten Vokalisen in der Gesangspraxis der Byzantiner". In Brandl, Rudolf Maria (ed.). Griechische Musik und Europa: Antike, Byzanz, Volksmusik der Neuzeit; Symposion "Die Beziehung der griechischen Musik zur Europäischen Musiktradition" vom 9. - 11. Mai 1986 in Würzburg. Orbis musicarum. Aachen: Ed. Herodot. pp. 67–80. ISBN 978-3-924007-77-5.
- Richter, Lukas. "Zosimus of Panopolis". Grove Music Online. doi:10.1093/gmo/9781561592630.article.31036.
- Strunk, William Oliver (1942). "The Tonal System of Byzantine Music". The Musical Quarterly. 28 (2): 190–204. doi:10.1093/mq/XXVIII.2.190.
- Strunk, William Oliver (1945). "Intonations and Signatures of the Byzantine Modes". The Musical Quarterly. 31 (3): 339–355. doi:10.1093/mq/XXXI.3.339.
- Strunk, William Oliver (1960). "The Antiphons of the Oktoechos". Journal of the American Musicological Society. 13 (1/3): 50–67. doi:10.2307/830246. JSTOR 830246.
- Taft, Robert (1977). "The Evolution of the Byzantine 'Divine Liturgy'". Orientalia Christiana Periodica. 43: 8–30.
- Tillyard, H. J. W. (1935). Handbook of the middle Byzantine musical notation (PDF). Monumenta Musicae Byzantinae, Subsidia. Vol. 1. Copenhagen: Levin & Munksgaard.
- Troelsgård, Christian (2007). "A New Source for the Early Octoechos? Papyrus Vindobonensis G 19.934 and its musical implications". Proceedings of the 1st International Conference of the ASBMH (PDF). pp. 668–679.
- Troelsgård, Christian (2011). Byzantine neumes: A New Introduction to the Middle Byzantine Musical Notation. Monumenta musicae byzantinae, Subsidia. Vol. 9. Copenhagen: Museum Tusculanum Press. ISBN 978-87-635-3158-0.
- Troelsgård, Christian (2001). "Psalm, § III Byzantine Psalmody". Grove Music Online. Oxford Music Online. doi:10.1093/gmo/9781561592630.article.48161.
- Wellesz, Egon (1961). A History of Byzantine Music and Hymnography. Oxford: Clarendon Press. ISBN 978-0-19-816111-0.
- Werner, Eric (1948). "The Origin of the Eight Modes in Music: A Study in Musical Symbolism". Hebrew College Annual. 21: 211–255. JSTOR 23503693.
- Werner, Eric (1959). The Sacred Bridge. London: Dennis Dobson.
