= Aurelian of Réôme =

Frankish writer and music theorist (fl. c. 840 – 850)

Aurelian of Réôme (Aurelianus Reomensis) (fl. c. 840 – 850) was a Frankish writer and music theorist. He is the author of the Musica disciplina, the earliest extant treatise on music from medieval Europe.

== Life ==
Next to nothing is known about his life but what can be inferred by the treatise itself. For a time he was a member of the monastery at Saint Jean de Réôme, in the Côte-d'Or near the present-day town of Moutiers-Saint-Jean. Aurelian said in his treatise that he was a former monk of Réôme, but had been dismissed from the community for an unspecified offense; he wrote the treatise as a form of penance, both at the request of his colleagues who needed his specialized knowledge, and as an attempt to supplicate Abbot Bernard of St Jean de Réôme; whether or not he was admitted back into the monastery as a result of his writing is not known. There is a record of an abbot named Bernard at St Jean de Réôme beginning in 846, who shortly afterward became bishop of Autun; this has helped establish the date for the treatise.

There has been an attempt to associate Aurelian of Réôme with Aurelian, archbishop of Lyon from 876 to 895, but the evidence for this is circumstantial at best.

== Work and influence ==
The Musica disciplina is like the other more famous contemporary treatises (Musica and Scolica enchiriadis, Hucbald of Saint-Amand, Regino of Prüm etc.) one of the earliest Carolingian chant treatises which combine the reception of Ancient Greek music theory (ἁρμονικαὶ) with questions relevant to the contemporary performance of liturgical chant. Isidore of Seville wrote with a similar impact on contemporary Visigothic chant about music, while his subject was the music of antiquity as well.

=== Aurelian's tonaries ===
Aurelian's work is one of the earliest authors concerned about Carolingian plainchant, still within the period during which Gregorian chant became standardized by its oral transmission in northern and western Europe. One copy became the earliest extant sample of musical notation, although it was added later. Hence, the particular notational scheme which was used so far by a later scribe resisted definitive interpretation, and it only appears randomly in the earliest manuscript.

One of the most important topics covered in the Musica disciplina, to contemporary scholars, is the eight Tones (octoechos), today known as the church modes which Aurelian called "toni". As sources of the mathematic science, Aurelian used Isidore of Seville, Cassiodorus, and above all Boethius, but the eight Tones were more likely imported from Byzantine music during the 8th century, though his treatise belonged to a Carolingian chant treatise type called tonary (chapter IX-XVII).

The treatise was completed by several lists and descriptions of more than 100 chants. Like other tonaries of the time, no musical notation had been used originally.

=== Aurelian's music theory ===
He did not only refer to the octave species (modi) used by the ancient Greeks as well as by Boethius (Dorian, Phrygian, etc.), he also used names of intonation formulas communicated between chanters, such as noannoeane, and noeagis. They were obviously inspired by the Byzantine enechemata, but not identical. In the 8th chapter he also included the fascinating bit that Charlemagne himself had commanded that four more Tones should be added to the existing eight, making a total of twelve.

In the discussion of 15 octave species (chapter VI), Aurelian ascends from the lowest octave of Hypodorian (A—g—a) up to the highest octave a ninth higher which he called "Hyperlydian" (b—aa—bb). Including this conclusion at the end, the whole passage was compiled literally from Aurelius Cassiodorus. This only reference to a triphonic tone system within Carolingian chant theory, also known as the "lesser perfect system" within the Aristoxenian school, was probably the reason for Aurelian's own name as author and compiler of music theory. It proves that the early use of b flat was more influenced by triphonia. The tone system behind the 15 octaves is built in three conjunct ("synemmena") tetrachords (ypodorius—dorius—hyperdorius: A—D—G—c), with another tetrachord below (hypo) and a third one above (hyper). Within triphonia, three species like Dorian (D—c—d defined by the tetrachord tone—half tone—tone), Phrygian (E—d—e defined by the tetrachord half tone—tone—tone), and Lydian were already enough to represent the tone system, as it was needed during the use of b flat. But Cassiodorus' simplification corrupted the Lydian tonus, so that the tetrachords were based on C#—F#—b—e as a kind of transposed Phrygian species, and the Eolian tonus (C—F—♭—e♭) replaced it.

A current matter of controversy is in as much the Musica disciplina belonged to the tradition of the mathematical science music, and in as much it contributed within the Carolingian Renaissance simply as a chant manual called "tonary," which supported the oral transmission of Carolingian reform chant. Music as science had only been revived in the late 8th century by Alcuin, as part of a campaign to revive all of the liberal arts of antiquity, and which was another purpose of the Carolingian Renaissance.

There may have been prior, lost works on music from the late 8th and early 9th centuries; but if so, Aurelian makes no reference to them. In addition, Aurelian made many mistakes interpreting Boethius. Other topics covered in the Musica disciplina include the "music of the spheres," the ethical and moral effects of music, and musical proportions; in addition he includes a narrative about the inventors of music, for example Pythagoras and Jubal.

== References and further reading ==
=== Sources ===
- Aurelian of Réôme. "Valenciennes, Bibliothèque municipale, Ms. 148, ff.57v-89r". "Musica disciplina", Abbey Saint-Amand (ca. 880-885). Gallica.
- Aurelian of Réôme. "Oxford, Bodleian Library, Ms. Canon. Misc. 212, ff.40r-48v". The folios of "Musica disciplina" have not been published yet. Collection of music treatises of the 14th century.

=== Editions ===
- Aurelianus Reomensis (1784), "Musica disciplina", in Gerbert, Martin (ed.), Scriptores ecclesiastici de musica sacra potissimum, vol. 1 (Hildesheim 1963 reprint ed.), St Blaise: Typis San-Blasianis, pp. 27–63, archived from the original on 2016-05-30.

Edition based on Valenciennes, Bibliothèque municipale, Ms. 148, ff.57v-89r:

- Gushee, Lawrence, ed. (1975). Aureliani Reomensis Musica disciplina. Corpus scriptorum de musica. Vol. 21. Rome: American Institute of Musicology. pp. 53–135.

Alternative edition based on Oxford, Bodleian Library, Canonici misc. 212, ff.40r-48v. 8.38-10.29:

- Aurelianus Reomensis (1975). Gushee, Lawrence (ed.). Musica disciplina, cap. VIII-XVI. Corpus scriptorum de musica. Vol. 21. Rome: American Institute of Musicology. pp. 136–153.
- Cassiodorus, Aurelius (1784), "Caput V. Libri Cassiodori de artibus ac disciplinis liberalium litterarum", in Gerbert, Martin (ed.), Scriptores ecclesiastici de musica sacra potissimum, vol. 1 (Hildesheim 1963 reprint ed.), St Blaise: Typis San-Blasianis, pp. 15–19.

=== Studies ===
- Atkinson, Charles M. (2008). The critical nexus: Tone-System, Mode, and Notation in Early Medieval Music. Oxford, New York [etc.]: Oxford University Press. ISBN 978-0-19-514888-6.
- Bellingham, Jane. "Aurelian of Réôme". Grove Music Online. Oxford Music Online. Oxford University Press.
- Glatthaar, Michael (2011). "Bernard von Réome und die Datierung der "Musica disciplina" Aurelians". Revue Bénédictine. 121 (2): 357–381. doi:10.1484/J.RB.5.100458.
- Haggh, Barbara (2001). "Aurelian's Library". Cantus Planus: Papers read at the ninth meeting, Esztergom and Visegrád 1998. Budapest: Magyar Tudomanyos Akademia. pp. 271–300.
- Hoppin, Richard H. Medieval Music. New York, W.W. Norton & Co., 1978. ISBN 0-393-09090-6.
- Huglo, Michel (1971). Les Tonaires: Inventaire, Analyse, Comparaison [avec "Notes sur la réproduction de mes 'Tonaires' en pdf", 2012]. Publications de la Société française de musicologie. Vol. 2. Paris: Société française de musicologie.
- Mathiesen, Thomas J. "Greece, §1: Ancient, 6. Music theory, (iii) Aristoxenian tradition, (a) Notes". Grove Music Online.
- Powers, Harold, "Mode, § II Medieval Modal Theory, 2. Carolingian synthesis, 9th–10th centuries", Grove Music Online.
- Raasted, Jørgen (1988). "Die Jubili Finales und die Verwendung von interkalierten Vokalisen in der Gesangspraxis der Byzantiner". In Brandl, Rudolf Maria (ed.). Griechische Musik und Europa: Antike, Byzanz, Volksmusik der Neuzeit; Symposion "Die Beziehung der griechischen Musik zur Europäischen Musiktradition" vom 9. - 11. Mai 1986 in Würzburg. Orbis musicarum. Aachen: Ed. Herodot. pp. 67–80. ISBN 978-3-924007-77-5.
