= Octoechos (liturgy) =

Eastern Orthodox liturgical work

The Octoechos book (from the Greek: ἡ [βίβλος] Ὀκτώηχος Ancient Greek pronunciation: [okˈtoixos]; from ὀκτώ 'eight' and ἦχος 'sound, mode' called echos; Church Slavonic: Осмѡгласникъ, Osmoglasnik from о́смь 'eight' and гласъ 'voice, sound') is a liturgical book containing a repertoire of hymns ordered in eight parts according to eight echoi (tones or modes). Originally created in the Monastery of Stoudios during the 9th century as a hymnal complete with musical notation, it is still used in many rites of Eastern Christianity. The book with similar function in the Western Church is the tonary, and both contain the melodic models of an octoechos system; however, while the tonary serves simply for a modal classification, the octoechos is organized as a cycle of eight weeks of services. The word itself can also refer to the repertoire of hymns sung during the celebrations of the Sunday Office.

== Role of meter in the Octoechos ==
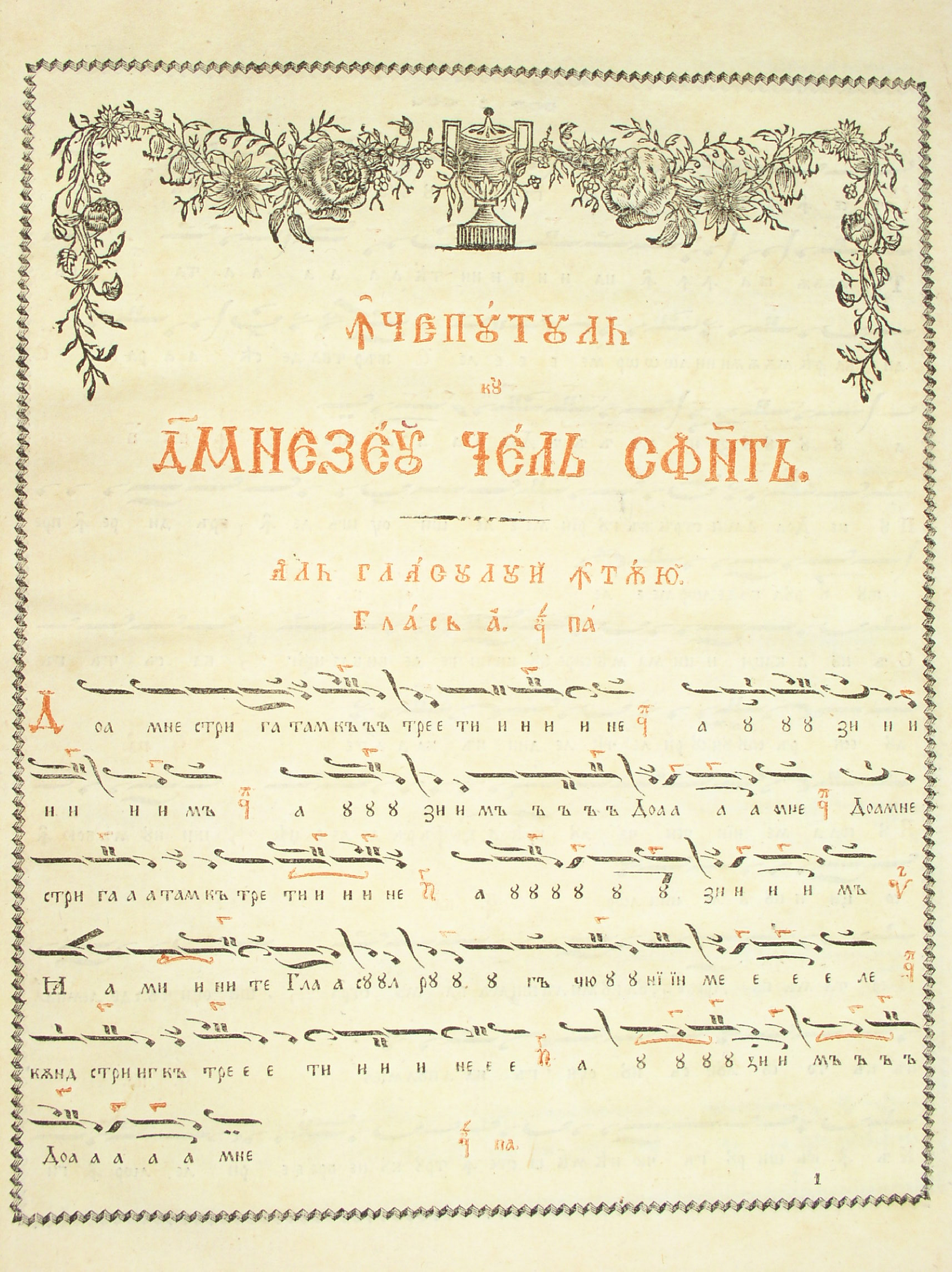
The Hesperinos psalm (Ps. 140) in Romanian printed in Cyrillic types is often used as a sticheron avtomelon in echos protos (glas a') (Anastasimatar, Vienna 1823)

Many hymns in the Octoechos, such as Kathismata, Odes, and Kontakia are set in a strict meter—a fixed number of syllables with particular stress patterns, consistent throughout multiple verses. Complex poems are written with syllabic patterns matching the meter of a familiar hymn written prior. One example of such a hymn is "Ἡ Παρθένος σήμερον", the prooimion of the Christmas kontakion composed by Romanos the Melodist, set to a melody in the third mode of the Octoechos. This hymn has served as the metrical basis for many other Kontakia. In the current tradition the kontakion exists as well as a model to recite many other kontakia prosomoia which was also translated into Old Church Slavonic. In the particular genre kontakion this model is still regarded as an idiomelon due to the complexity of the poetic form.

Usually the arrangement of the syllables with their metric accentuation are composed as a well-known hymn tune or sticheron avtomelon within the melos of a certain echos. These melodic stichera are called automela, because they can easily be adapted to other texts, even if the number of syllables of verse varies—the so-called prosomoia. (Note: The Three Classes of Melodic Forms for Stichera, II. Automela (Samopodobny, Model Melodies).) The prooimion which precedes the kontakion for Christmas is recited today with a simple melody in a rather sophisticated heirmologoc melos of echos tritos; its most important part is the conclusion called "ephymnion" (in italic characters) which uses one and the same melody for all kontakia of the same echos (at the end of the prooimion as well as at the end of each following oikos):

Ἡ Παρθένος σήμερον τὸν ὑπερούσιον τίκτει
καὶ ἡ γῆ τὸ σπήλαιον τῷ ἀπροσίτῳ προσάγει,
Ἄγγελοι μετά ποιμένων δοξολογούσι,
Μάγοι δὲ μετά ἀστέρος ὁδοιπορούσιν,
δι’ ἡμάς γὰρ ἐγεννήθη παιδίον νέον,
ὁ πρὸ αἰώνων Θεός.

A hymn may more or less imitate an automelon melodically and metrically—depending, if the text has exactly the same number of syllables with the same accents as those of verses in the corresponding automelon. Such a hymn was usually called sticheron prosomoion or in the case of kontakion, kontakion prosomoion, the echos and opening words of the model (a sticheron avtomelon or in this particular case the prooimion of the Nativity kontakion) were usually indicated. (Note: The Three Classes of Melodic Forms for Stichera, III. Prosomoia (Podobny, Special Melodies).) For example, the Octoechos' kontakion for Sunday Orthros in echos tritos has the indication, that it should be sung to the melody of the above Christmas kontakion. (Note: See the article about the three melody types of stichera, where the texts of the two kontakia are compared as an illustration (idiomelon, avtomelon, prosomoion).) Both kontakia have nearly the same number of syllables and accents within its verses, so the exact melody of the former is slightly adapted to the latter, its accents have to be sung with the given accentuation patterns. (Note: The Three Classes of Melodic Forms for Stichera, I. Idiomela (Samoglasny, Independent Melodies).)

The printed book Octoechos with the Sunday cycles is often without any musical notation and the determination of a hymn's melody is indicated by the echos or glas according to the section within the book and its avtomelon, a melodic model defined by the melos of its mode. Since this book collects the repertoire of melodies sung every week, educated chanters knew all these melodies by heart, and they learnt how to adapt the accentuation patterns to the printed texts of the hymns while singing out of other text books like the menaion.

== Greek octoechos and parakletike ==
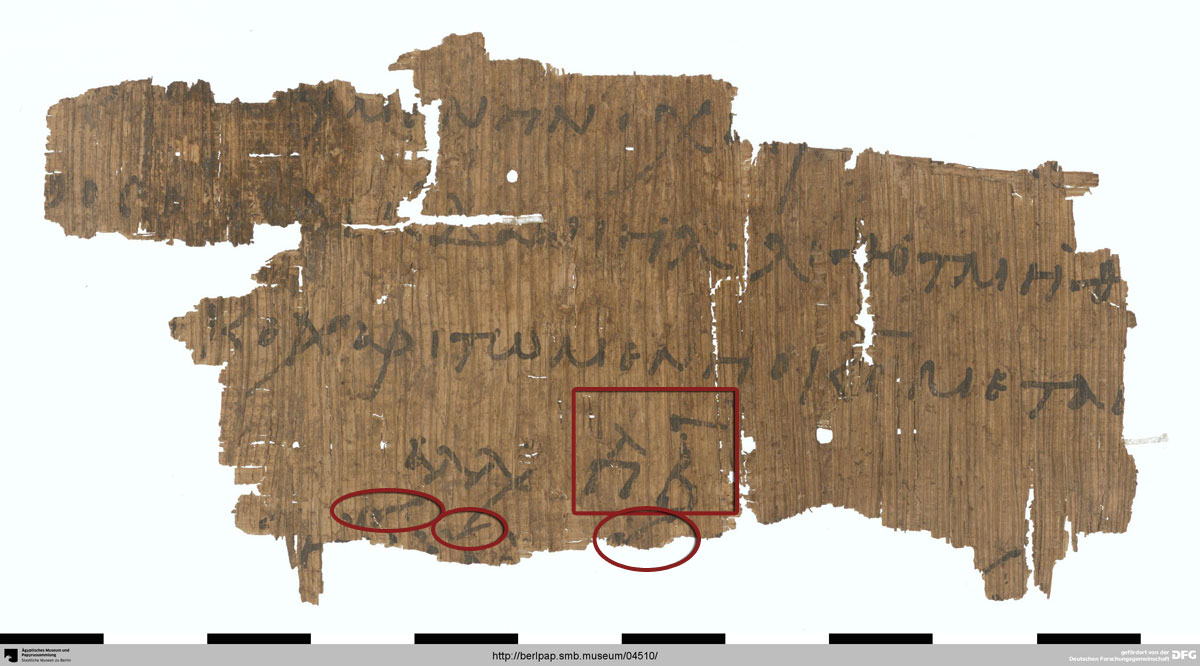
Papyrus fragment of a 6th-century tropologion found in Egypt, marked in red are the modal signature and some early ekphonetic signs of the following theotokion ("another one") which is composed in a melos of echos plagios devteros (D-Bk P. 21319)

=== Types of octoechos books ===
The Great Octoechos (ὀκτώηχος ἡ μεγάλη), or Parakletike, contains proper office hymns for each weekday. (Note: Octoechos is often used to describe a smaller volume that contains only the hymns for the Sunday services. In order to distinguish the longer version from the short one, the term Paraklētikē (Greek: Παρακλητική) can be used as well for the Great Octoechos. The word Paraklētikē comes from the Greek parakalein (παρακαλεῖν), meaning, "to pray, implore, comfort, encourage" (the ordinary prayer texts for the weekdays).) The earliest state of a Great Octoechos collection are Mss. gr. 1593 and 776 of the Library at Saint Catherine's Monastery which had been identified as belonging to one manuscript (ET-MSsc Ms. Gr. 776 & 1593 about 800). The hymns of the books Octoechos and Heirmologion had been collected earlier in a book called Troparologion or Tropologion. It already existed during the 6th century in the Patriarchate of Antiochia, before it became a main genre of the centers of an Octoechos hymn reform in the monasteries of Saint Catherine on Mount Sinai and Mar Saba in Palestine, where St. John Damascene (c. 676–749) and Cosmas of Maiuma created a cycle of stichera anastasima. Probably for this reason John of Damascus is regarded as the creator the Hagiopolitan Octoechos and the Hagiopolites treatise itself claims his authorship right at the beginning. It has only survived completely in a 14th-century copy, but its origin likely dates back to the time between the Council of Nicaea and the time of Joseph the Hymnographer (~816-886), when the treatise could still have introduced the book Tropologion. The earliest papyrus sources of the Tropologion can be dated to the 6th century:

Choral singing saw its most brilliant development in the temple of Holy Wisdom in Constantinople during the reign of Emperor Justinian the Great. National Greek musical harmonies, or modes — the Dorian, Phrygian, Lydian, and Mixolydian modes — were adapted to the needs of Christian hymnography. Then John of Damascus started a new, third period in the history of Church singing. He introduced what is known as the osmoglasie — a system of singing in eight tones, or melodies —, and compiled a liturgical singing book bearing the title "Ochtoechos," which literally signifies "the book of the eight tones."

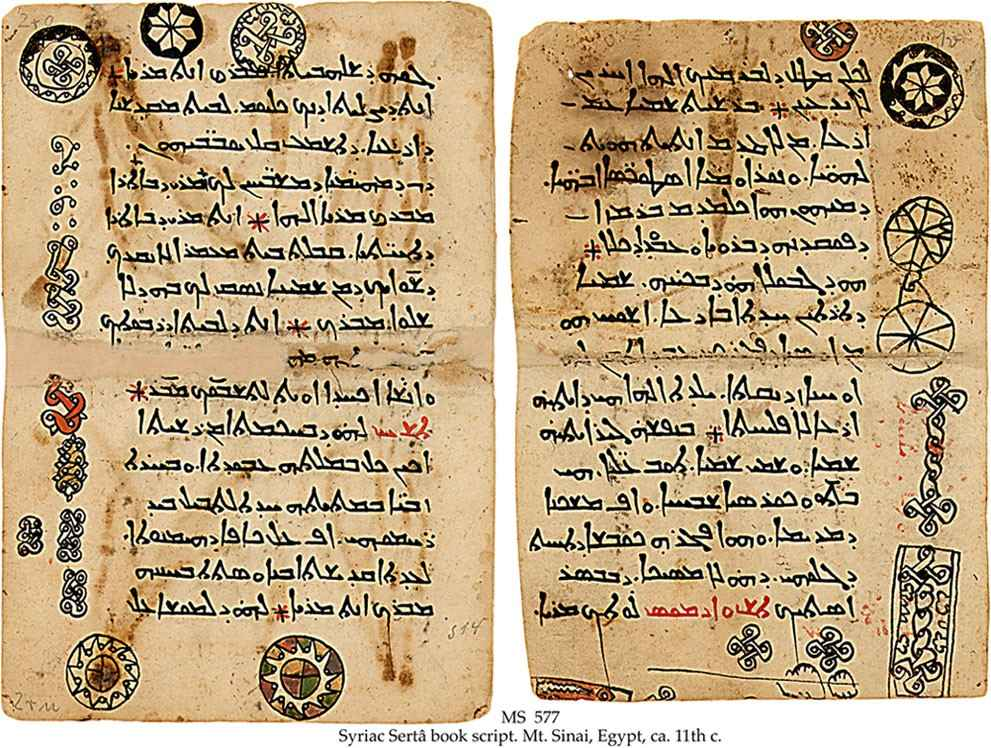
Melkite Heirmologion, written in Syriac language, using Sertâ book script at Saint Catherine's Monastery, Mount Sinai (11th century) Oslo, Schøyen Collection, Ms. 577.

The earliest version of a Tropologion dedicated to the repertoire of Octoechos was created by Severus of Antioch, Paul of Edessa and John Psaltes between 512 and 518. The Tropologion was expanded upon by St. Cosmas of Maiuma († 773), Theodore the Studite († 826) and his brother Joseph of Thessalonica († 832), Theophanes the Branded (c. 775–845), the hegoumenai and hymnographers Kassia (810-865) and Theodosia, Thekla the Nun, Metrophanes of Smyrna († after 880), Paul, Metropolit of Amorium, and by the emperors Leo VI and Constantine VII (10th century) as well as numerous anonymous authors. This reduced version was simply called Octoechos and it was often the last part of the sticherarion, the new notated chant book of the reformers.

Until the 14th century the book Octoechos, as far as it belonged to the Sticherarion, was ordered according to hymn genre of the repertoire. Later the thematic structure of the stichera anastasima which had to be sung during Hesperinos on Saturday and during Orthros on Sunday, were emphasised and ordered according to the eight echoi, each of the eight parts structured according to the order, as they had to be sung during the evening and morning service. They became a well structured book for the daily use of chanters like the later book Anastasimatarion or in Slavonic Voskresnik. Since the 17th century different collections of the Octoechos had been separated as their own books about certain Hesperinos psalms like the Anoixantarion an octoechos collection for Psalm 103, the Kekragarion for Psalm 140, and the Pasapnoarion for the Psalm verse 150:6.

=== Types of stichera ===
- Stichera anastasima: In the new book anastasimatarion (voskresnik) there are 24 stichera anastasima ("resurrection hymns") which are usually ascribed to John of Damascus, three of them in each echos. Most of them do not appear within the book Octoechos before the 15th century.
- Stichera anatolika: Composed about the longest stichoi concerning the resurrection motive. The name probably derived from a certain composer or from their local origin.
- Stichera alphabetika: 24 stichera composed in a style similar to the anatolika. They are usually ordered according to the alphabet concerning their incipit.
- Anabathmoi: Antiphons structured in eight parts according to the octoechos, each one consisting of three or four sets of three troparia. The kyrioi echoi (authentic modes) are composed to parallel verses of the Gradual Psalms, while the plagioi echoi (plagal modes) usually begin by imitating Psalm 119. The last sticheron of each antiphon usually begins with the words "ἁγιῷ πνεύματι." The anavathmoi were often a separated collection within the book Octoechos, which was no longer included in later books.
- Heothina anastasima: The eleven stichera of the heothina are ascribed to the Emperor Leo VI and are sung in connection with the Matins Gospel during Orthros. The first eight follow the octoechos order, with the plagios tetartos in the enharmonic phthora nana. The ninth sticheron was composed in echos plagios protos, the tenth in the phthora nenano (plagios devteros), and the eleventh in the diatonic plagios tetartos.
- Exaposteilaria anastasima: The eleven exaposteilaria anastasima are ascribed to Emperor Constantine VII. Created during the Macedonian renaissance, they are a later part of the repertoire which cannot be found in manuscripts before the 11th century. The cycle was sung since the Sunday following Pentecost, followed by a theotokion and a heothinon.
- Stichera dogmatika: These stichera are dedicated to the Mother of God (Theotokos) and they are called "dogmatika," because the hymns are about the dogmas concerned with the virgin Mary. The section of dogmatika, 24 with three for each echos, was usually completed with other Marianic hymns called "theotokia". Books with hymns about the Theotokos are sometimes called Theotokarion.
- Stichera staurosima and staurotheotokia: (devoted to the Holy Cross and to the Mother of God), sung on Wednesdays and Fridays.

The Octoechos also included other stichera dedicated to particular saints according to the provenance of a certain monastery, which also allows conclusions concerning place, where the chant book was used.

Georgian Iadgari (tropologion, 10th century)

=== Temporal cycles and prosomoia ===
The Sticherarion did not only include the book Octoechos, but also the books Menaion, Triodion and Pentecostarion. Certain stichera of the other books, stichera prosomoia which rather belonged to an oral tradition, because they were later composed by using the avtomela written in the book Parakletike. The early prosomoia composed by Theodore the Studite for the evening service during Lenten period which belong to the Triodion book. Since the 14th century, sticheraria also had notated collections of the prosomoia sung within Paschal tide (tesserakostes). They were made over idiomela of the menaion and notated with the new verses, while most of the prosomoia relied entirely on an oral tradition. Although these prosomoia were part of the Pentecostarion, this cycle was often written within the Octoechos section.

Nevertheless, a temporal eight-week-order was always the essential part of the Octoechos, at least as a liturgical concept. The temporal organisation of the mobile feast cycle and its lessons was result of the Studite reform since Theodore the Studite; their books had already been translated by Slavic monks during the 9th century. The eight tones can be found as the Paschal cycle (moveable cycle) of the church year, the so-called Pentecostarion starting with the second Sunday of (the eighth day of) Easter. The first usually changes the echos each day, while the third week started the eight-week cycle with the second echos, each week in just one echos. The same cycle started in the triodion with the Lenten period until Easter, (Note: All of Great Lent, the periods of Cheesefare Week and Holy Week which are joined, respectively, to the beginning and end of Great Lent) with the Lenten Friday preceding the subsequent Palm Sunday. (Note: Each day of Bright Week (Easter Week) uses propers in a different tone, Sunday: Tone One, Monday: Tone Two, skipping the least festive of the tones, the grave (heavy) tone.) Each day of the week has a distinct theme for which hymns in each tone are found in the texts of the Octoechos. During this period, the Octoechos is not sung on weekdays and it is furthermore not sung on Sundays from Palm Sunday through the Sunday of All Saints. (Note: Although many of the Sunday resurrection hymns are replicated in the Pentecostarion)

After Pentecost, the singing of the Great Octoechos on weekdays continued until Saturday of Meatfare Week, on Sundays there was another cycle organised by the eleven heothina with their exaposteilaria and their theotokia.

In the daily practice the prosomeia of the Octoechos are combined with idiomela from the other books: On the fixed cycle, i.e., dates of the calendar year, the Menaion and on the movable cycle, according to season, the Lenten Triodion (in combination from the previous year's Paschal cycle). The texts from these volumes displace some of those from the Octoechos. The less hymns are sung from the Octoechos the more have to be sung from the other books. On major feast days, hymns from the Menaion entirely displace those from the Octoechos except on Sundays, when only a few Great Feasts of the Lord eclipse the Octoechos.

Note that the Octoechos contains sufficient texts, so that none of these other books needs to be used—a holdover from before the invention of printing and the completion and wide distribution of the rather large 12-volume Menaion—, but portions of the Octoechos (e.g., the last three stichera following "Lord, I have cried," the Hesperinos psalm 140) are seldom used nowadays and they are often completely omitted in the currently printed volumes.

== Old Church Slavonic reception of the Greek octoechos ==
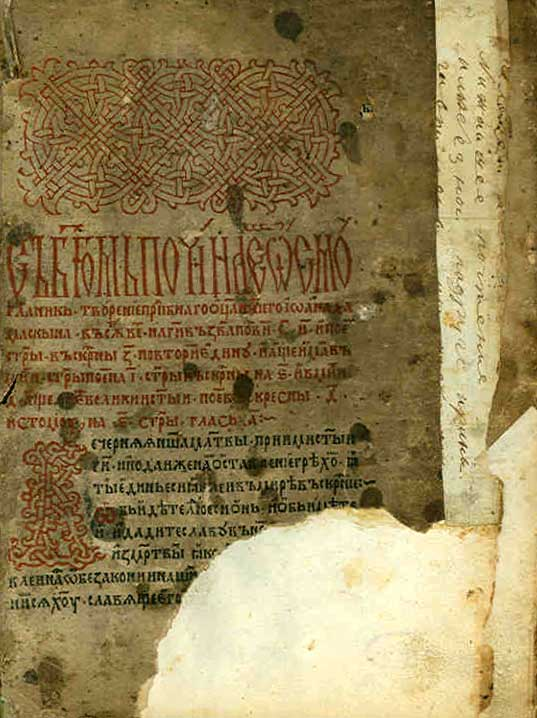
The first printed Octoechos (Schweipolt Fiol, Kraków 1491)

Even before a direct exchange between Slavic monks and monks of the Stoudios Monastery, papyrus fragments offer evidence of earlier translations of Greek hymns. The early fragments show that hymns and their melodies developed independently in an early phase until the 9th century. Cyril and Methodius and their followers within the Ohrid-School were famous for the translation of Greek hymnody between 863 and 893, but it is also a period of a reformative synthesis of liturgical forms, the creation of new hymnographical genres and their organisation in annual cycles.

=== Slavic Oktoich or Osmoglasnik and Sbornik ===
Though the name of the book "Oktoich" derived from the Greek name Octoechos (Old Slavonic "Osmoglasnik," because "glas" is the Slavonic term for echos), the Slavic book did rather correspond to the unnotated Tropologion, and often it included the hymns of the Irmolog as well. The Slavic reception, although it can be regarded as faithful translation of the Byzantine books, is mainly based on early Theta notation, which was used by Slavic reformers in order to develop own forms of notation in Moscow and Novgorod (znamenny chant). The translation activities between 1062 and 1074 at the Kievan Pechersk Lavra had been realised without the help of South Slavic translators. The earliest known Slavonic manuscripts with neumes date from the late 11th or 12th century (mainly Stichirar, Kondakar and Irmolog). Concerning the earlier translations of the hymns and later translations in Russia, we can observe two different approaches to translation, one which favours the musical and metrical structure and another which favours the literal translation of the hymns. The school represented by Kliment of Ohrid, Naum, or Constantine of Preslav endeavoured to match the Greek text in the number of syllables in the hymns and to preserve the verse structure indicated by the corresponding neumes, but the resulting meaning of the hymns could change so considerably that, in certain cases, the only aspect the original and the translation had in common was the prescribed music, i.e., the indicated melos and echos. On the other hand, the later translations during the missions in Russia had their emphasis on a literal translation of the texts, but this resulted in altering the metrical structure given by the avtomela and the heirmoi so much that the music had to be recomposed.

Another difference between the two Slavic receptions was the tonal system. Since the Southern Slavic reception did not change the system of prosomoia, it corresponded to the Hagiopolitan Octoechos. Glas ("voice") 1–4 are the authentic modes or kyrioi echoi, and the remaining 5–8 are the plagal modes or plagioi echoi, the latter term coming from the Medieval Greek plagios, "oblique" (from plagos, "side"). Unlike the Western octoechos, glas 5–8 (the plagioi echoi) used the same octave species like glas 1–4, but their final notes were a fifth lower on the bottom of the pentachord with respect to the finales of the kyrioi on the top of each pentachord, the melodic range composed in the plagioi was usually smaller. There was an alternative tonal system based on the obihodniy zvukoryad which was used in the Northern Slavic reception in Novgorod. It was based on a hexaechos, since it used a tone system based on triphonia with three modes organised in fourth equivalence.

Often the Parakletike was divided in two volumes as Pettoglasniks. Another popular book, also characteristic for the Obihod reception, was the so-called Sbornik ("Anthologion" or better "Synekdemos")—a chant book which contained all the chant of the divine liturgy, including proper chant of the Sticherarion books (Miney, the Triods, and the Oktoich).

=== Print editions with musical notation ===
Today heirmological melodies used primarily for canons have their own octoechos mele and their tempo, which employ a slightly modified scale for each tone; in canons, each troparion in an ode uses the meter and melody of the ode's irmos (analogous to prosomoia for sticheraric modes of a tone) and, therefore, even when a canon's irmos is never sung, its irmos is nonetheless specified so as to indicate the melody. A volume called an "Irmolog" contains the irmosi of all the canons of all eight tones as well as a few sundry other pieces of music. Abridged versions of the Octoechos printed with musical notation were frequently published. As simple Octoechos they provided the hymns for the evening (večernaja molitva) and morning service (utrenna) between Saturday and Sunday.

In Russia the Oktoich was the very first book printed (incunabulum) in Cyrillic typeface, which was published in Poland (Kraków) in 1491—by Schweipolt Fiol, a German native of Franconia. Only seven copies of this first publication are known to remain and the only complete one is in the collection of the Russian National Library.

In 1905 the Zograf Monastery published a set of Slavonic chant books whose first volume is the Voskresnik with the repertoire of the simple Osmoglasnik. Within the Russian Orthodox church a chant book Octoechos with notated with kryuki developed during the late 15th century. The first print edition Oktoikh notnago peniya, sirech' Osmoglasnik was published with Kievan staff notation in 1772. It included hymns in Znamenny Chant as well as the melodic models (avtomela) for different types of hymns for each Glas.

=== Caveat ===
Northern Slavs in modern times often do not use the eight-tone music system—although they always do use the book Octoechos—rather singing all hymns in the same scale but with different melodies for each tone for each of several types of classifications of hymns.

== Oriental hymnals ==
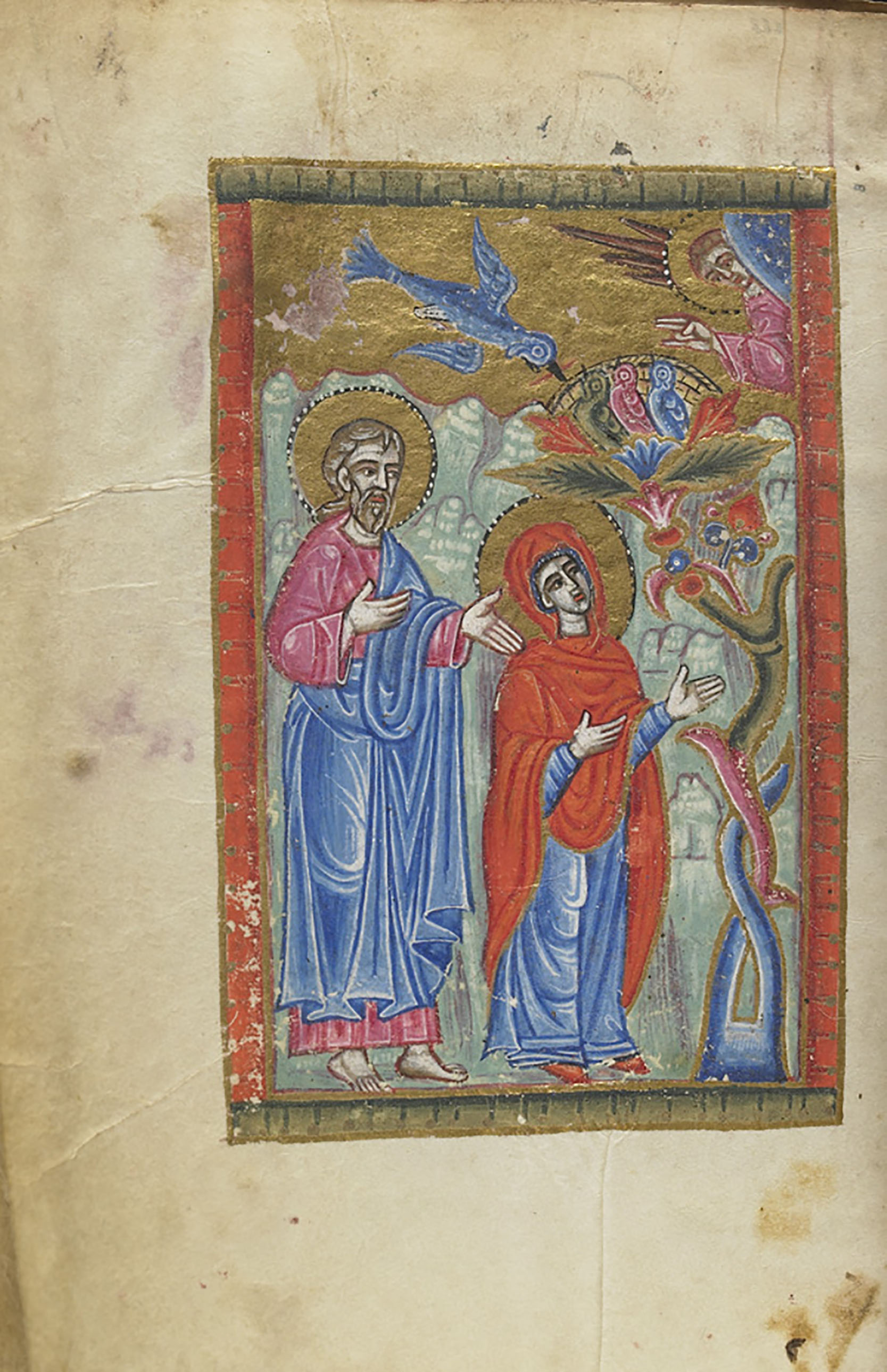
Illumination in an Armenian Hymnal (Šaraknoc', 1651)

Although the Georgian Iadgari is not the oldest manuscript among the complete tropologia which could be preserved until the present day, the Iadgari offers the most complete insight into the development of hymnography and the cathedral rite of Jerusalem. Other hymn books developed between the 7th and the 11th centuries starting from the Hagiopolitan hymn reform of 692. They contain stichera, kontakia all kinds of troparia and canons without being necessarily dependent on the tradition of Byzantine chant and later developments of the Stoudios Monastery since the 9th century. The reason of this independence is, that the church history of Armenia and Georgia preceded the Byzantine imperial age about 50 years and both traditions were more oriented to the Patriarchates of Antioch and Jerusalem. This section describes Oriental and Caucasian hymnals as they have been used by Armenians until the genocide by the end of the Ottoman Empire, and as they are still used among Orthodox Christians in Syria, Persia, Armenia and Georgia.

=== Syrian Tropligin ===
The Tropologion developed also in Syria and was called in Syriac Tropligin. A Syriac translation of the "Octoechos of Antioch", tropologion created by Severus of Antioch, Paul of Edessa and John Psaltes (early sixth century), was copied in 675, but still during the 9th century Tropligins were organised in a similar way like the Georgian Iadgari.

The Syriac Orthodox Church today still makes use of a system of eight modes (usually classified as makam). Each hymn (Syriac: qolo, plural: qole) is composed in one of these eight modes. Some modes have variants (shuhlophe) similar to the "special melodies" mentioned above. Only skilled chanters can master these variants.

The modal cycle consists of eight weeks. Each Sunday or Feast day is assigned one of the eight modes. During the weekday offices, known in Syriac by the name Shhimo, the 1st and 5th modes are paired together, so are the 2nd and 6th, the 3rd and 7th, and the 4th and 8th. If a particular Sunday makes use of the 1st mode, the following Monday is sung with the 5th mode, Tuesday with the 1st mode, etc., with the pair alternating every day of the week (see the table provided in Guide to the Eight Modes in the External Links below).

The ecclesiastical year starts with Qudosh `Idto (The Consecration of the Church), a feast observed on the eighth Sunday before Christmas (Yaldo). The 1st mode is sung on this day. The following Sunday makes use of the 2nd mode, and so on, repeating the cycle until it starts again the next year. The cycle is interrupted only by feasts which have their own tones assigned to them. Similar to the Byzantine usage, each day of Easter Week has its own mode, except the Syriacs do not skip the 7th mode. Thus, the Sunday after Easter, called New Sunday (Hadto) is in the 8th mode rather than the 1st.

In one type of hymn used by the Syriac Church, the Qole Shahroye (Vigils), each of the modes is dedicated to a theme: The 1st and 2nd modes are dedicated to the Virgin Mary, the 3rd and 4th to the saints, the 5th and 6th to penitence, and the 7th and 8th to the departed.

The primary collection of hymns in the eight modes is the Beth Gazo d-ne`motho, or "Treasury of Chants."

=== Armenian Šaraknoc' ===
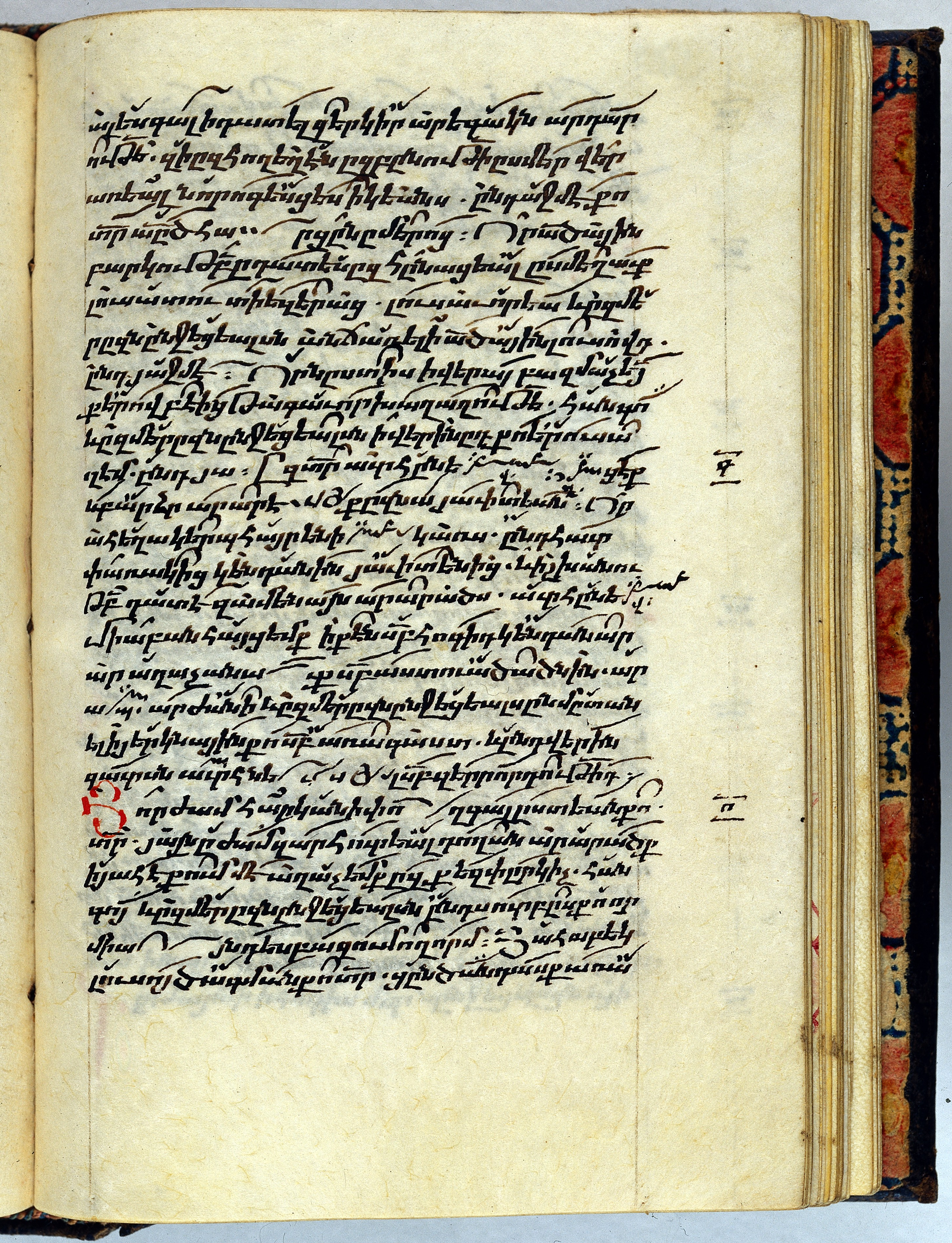
Armenian Hymnal (1679) with khaz notation

In the Armenian Apostolic Church, the system of eight modes is referred to as oot tzayn (eight voices). Although there is no structural relation between the Greek and Armenian modes, the division into "authentic" and "plagal" modes is parallel. In Armenian terminology, the "Authentic" modes are referred to as "Voice" (Tzayn) and the "Plagal" modes are called "Side" (Koghm), and are utilized in the following order:

Greek	Armenian
First (ἦχος πρῶτος)	First Voice (aradjin tzayn)
Plagal of the First (ἦχος πλάγιος τοῦ πρώτου)	First Side (aradjin koghm)
Second (ἦχος δεύτερος)	Second Voice (yerkrord tzayn)
Plagal of the Second (ἦχος πλάγιος τοῦ δευτέρου)	Second, Principal Side (yerkrord, awag koghm)
Third (ἦχος τρίτος)	Third Voice (yerrord tzayn)
Grave (ἦχος βαρύς)	Third Side, low voice (yerrord koghm, vaṙ tzayn)
Fourth (ἦχος τέταρτος)	Fourth Voice (tchorrord tzayn)
Plagal of the Fourth (ἦχος πλάγιος τοῦ τετάρτου)	Fourth Side, Last Voice (tchorrord koghm, verdj tzayn)

This order is important, because it is the order in which the modes are used liturgically and different from the order of the Greek traditions. Instead of using one tone per week, the Armenians use one tone per day. Easter Sunday is always the First Voice, the next day is First Side, and so on throughout the year. However, the cycle does not actually begin on Easter day, but counts backwards from Easter Sunday to the First Sunday in Lent, which is always Forth Side, regardless of what mode the previous day was. Each mode of the oot tzayn has one or more tartzwadzk‘ (auxiliary) modes.

The Šaraknoc' is the book which contains the Šarakan, or Šaragan (Canons), hymns which constitute the substance of the musical system of Armenian liturgical chant in the eight modes. Originally, these were Psalms and Biblical Canticles that were chanted during the services. A Sharagan was composed of verses which were interspersed between the scriptural verses. Eventually, the Šarakan replaced the biblical text entirely. In addition, the eight modes are applied to the psalms of the Night office, called Kanonaklookh (Canon head). the Armenian Church also makes use of other modes outside of the oot tzayn.

== See also ==
- Armenian chant
- Iadgari of Mikael Modrekili
- Sticherarion
- Syriac sacral music
