= History of Barda =

History of Barda, Azerbaijan

History of Barda includes the history of the Azerbaijani city of Barda from the medieval period to the present day.

In ancient written sources, Barda is mentioned in different ways: Partav, Bakura (in the works of Claudius Ptolemy), Parda, Berda ("Kitabi Dede Gorgud"), Harum (in the poem "Iskender-Name" by Nizami Ganjavi), Firuzabad (in the works of Hamdallah Kazwini), etc.

The city was first mentioned in written sources dating back to the 5th century. Azerbaijani historian Mirza Jamal Javanshir Karabaghi in his work "History of Karabakh" notes that Barda was the first city founded on the territory of Karabakh.

For the first time the city was studied by the 20th-century Azerbaijani writer Abdurahim-bek Ahverdiev.

== Medieval period ==
According to the Armenian historian Movses Kaghankatvatsi, the city was founded during the reign of the Albanian king Vache II (459–484).

Barda flourished in the 4th and 5th centuries. Starting from 552, Barda had been a religious center of Caucasian Albania.

In the first half of the 7th century, Barda became a battleground of the Arab-Khazar wars. In 628, the city was captured by the Khazars. Attacks of Sasanian feudal lords on Barda in 639 were repelled by the Albanian king Javanshir. During the reign of the Caliph Uthman (644–656), Barda was taken by the Arabs. In 752, the city became the capital of the Arran region.

In 748–752, anti-Arab protests took place in Barda.

Parts of the city that were destroyed during the Arab-Khazar wars were restored during the reign of Caliph Muawiyah (7th century). There were fortress walls built around the city. The city itself was divided into two parts: the central part – Shahristan – and the craft center – Rabat – with caravanserais and merchant quarters. In the 8th and 9th centuries, the famous al-Kurkiy Bazaar was located here. According to the Arab authors al-Muqaddasi and al-Istakhri, the city's population was about 100,000 people.

With the collapse of the Caliphate and the emergence of feudal independent states on the territory of Azerbaijan, Barda became a part of the Sajid state and the Salarid state until the end of the 10th century.

In 944, the detachments of Prince Igor of Kiev attacked and captured Barda, known as the "Mother of Arran". However, the resistance of the local population and infectious diseases forced the Slavs to leave the city.

In 982, Barda was taken by the Shirvanshahs.

In the 12th century, the city was ravaged by the Mongols. According to the Arab historian Yagut al-Hamawi (1179–1229), the city was heavily destroyed.

== Early modern period ==
In the 15th century, Barda was attacked by the army of Emir Timur. In 1736, the city was sacked by Nader Shah.

Barda became a part of the Karabakh khanate as a small settlement, the population of which did not exceed 200–300 people.

== Contemporary period ==
To suppress the Karabakh uprising that broke out in the summer of 1920, a number of Azerbaijani cities-Barda, Terter, Aghdam, Khankendi, and Shusha were shelled and captured by Bolshevik forces.

The first machine-tractor stations (MTS) in the Azerbaijan SSR appeared in Barda and Goranboy.

In 1990, Barda became a haven for residents of Aghdam, Keldbajar, Lachin, and later Khojaly who lost their native lands in the First Karabakh war.

On March 24, 2006, President Ilham Aliyev issued an order "On additional measures to accelerate the socio-economic development of Agdam, Barda and Terter districts".

On October 8, 2020, the territory of Barda was shelled by the Armenian armed forces from the Tochka-U tactical missile system.

On October 28, 2020, Barda was subjected to repeated shelling by the Armenian armed forces from prohibited cluster shells. As a result, 21 civilians were killed and more than 70 wounded.

== Sightseeing places ==
- Bathhouse in the village of Shirvanli (12th century);
- Allah-Allah mausoleum (14th century);
- Akhsadan Baba crypts (14th century);
- tower mausoleum of Ahmad Nakhchivani (1322);
- Juma mosque (1324);
- Medieval domed mausoleum in Garagoyunlu;
- mausoleum in the village of Guloglular (18th century);
- tomb of Bahman Mirza (1880);
- Imamzadeh mausoleum-mosque with four minarets (17th–19th centuries):
- Ugurbeyli Mosque;
- remains of two bridges on the Terterchay river.
