= Cosmas of Maiuma =

Bishop and hymnographer

Saint Cosmas of Maiuma
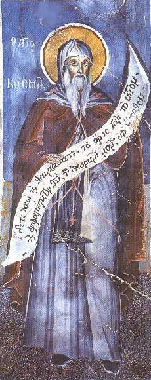

Hagiopolites
- Born: 8th century Damascus
- Died: 8th century Maiuma, Gaza
- Venerated in: Eastern Orthodox Church, Catholic Church
- Feast: October 14
- Attributes: Vested as a bishop, or as a monk, holding a scroll with the words of one of his hymns
- Patronage: Hymnographers

Cosmas of Maiuma, also called Cosmas Hagiopolites ("of the Holy City"), Cosmas of Jerusalem, Cosmas the Melodist, or Cosmas the Poet (d. 773 or 794), was a bishop and an important hymnographer in the East. He is venerated as a saint by the Eastern Orthodox Church and the Catholic Church.

== Life ==
Cosmas (Greek: Κοσμάς) was born in Damascus, modern-day Syria, but he was orphaned at a young age. He was adopted by Sergius, the father of John of Damascus (c. 676 – 749), and became John's foster-brother. The teacher of the two boys was an elderly Calabrian monk, also named Cosmas (known as "Cosmas the Monk" to distinguish him), who had been freed from slavery to the Saracens by John's father. John and Cosmas went from Damascus to Jerusalem, where both became monks in the lavra-type monastery of Sabbas the Sanctified near that city. Together they helped defend the Church against the heresy of iconoclasm.

Cosmas left the monastery in 743 when he was appointed Bishop of Maiuma, the port of ancient Gaza. He outlived John by many years and died in great old age.

== Works ==
As a learned prose-author, Cosmas wrote commentaries, or scholia, on the poems of Gregory of Nazianzus. He is regarded with great admiration as a poet. Cosmas and John of Damascus are considered to be the best representatives of the later Greek classical hymnography, the most characteristic examples of which are the artistic liturgical chants known as "canons". They worked together on developing the Octoechos.

In the Eastern Orthodox Church, Cosmas has been called "a vessel of divine grace" and "the glory of the Church." He composed the solemn canons for Matins of Lazarus Saturday, Palm Sunday, the Triodes (canons with only three Canticles) which are chanted during Holy Week, the first canon of the Nativity (based on a Nativity sermon by Gregory the Theologian), and is known for his finest work, "Canon for Christmas Day". Altogether, fourteen canons are attributed to him in the liturgical books of the Orthodox Church. His most well-known composition is "More honourable than the cherubim…" (which is included in the Axion Estin), sung regularly at Matins, the Divine Liturgy and other services.

The hymns of Cosmas were originally intended for the Divine Services of the Church of Jerusalem, but through the influence of Constantinople their use became universal in the Orthodox Church. It is not certain, however, that all the hymns ascribed to Cosmas in the liturgical books were really his compositions, especially as his teacher of the same name was also a hymn writer.

The Eastern Orthodox Church observes his feast on October 12 (Julian Calendar, it is October 25 of the Gregorian Calendar) and in Greek Church on October 14 (Julian, it is October 27).

== See also ==
- Saints Cosmas and Damian, 3rd-century martyrs

== Bibliography ==
- Collections of hymns, varying in number, are attributed to Cosmas, and may be found in Jacques-Paul Migne, Patrologia Graecae (P.G.), XCVIII, 459-524, and in Christ-Paranikas, Anthologia graeca carminum christianorum (Leipzig, 1871), 161-204.
- For the above-mentioned scholia on the poems of Gregory of Nazianzus, see Cardinal Angelo Mai, Spicilegium Romanum, II, Pt. II, 1-375, and Migne, P.G., XXXVIII, 339-679.
- In general, see Krumbacher, Gesch. der byzantinischen Literatur (2d ed., Munich, 1896), 674 sqq.
- Alexander P. Kazhdan - Stephen Gero, “Kosmas of Jerusalem: a more critical approach to his biography,” Byzantinische Zeitschrift 82 (1989), pp. 122–132.
