= All-Night Vigil (Tchaikovsky) =

All-Night Vigil for choir Всенощное бдение для хора
- by Pyotr Ilyich Tchaikovsky
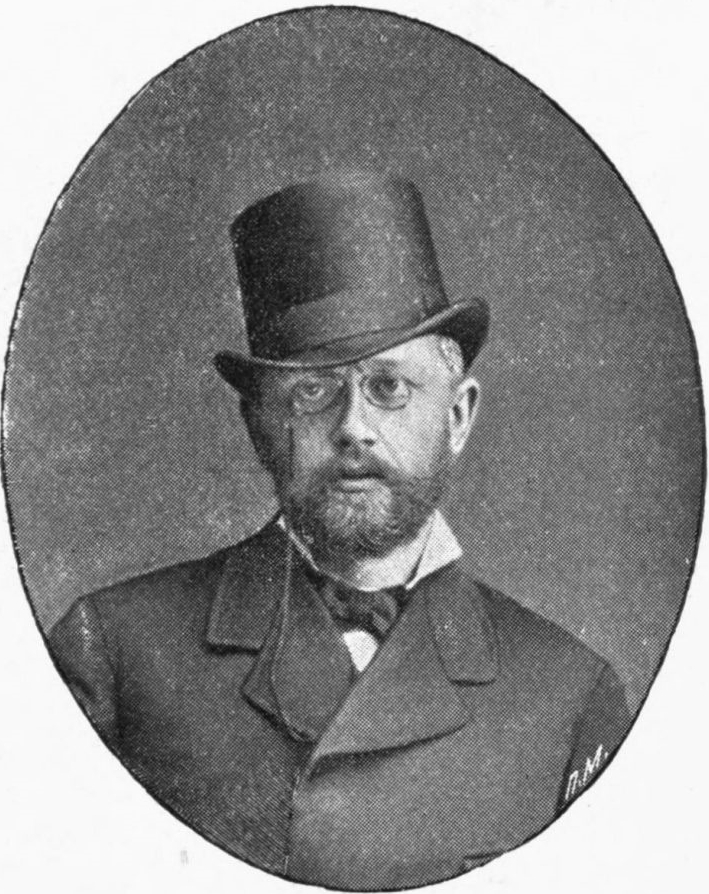
- Tchaikovsky c. 1877
- Form: Setting of the all-night vigil
- Language: Church Slavonic
- Composed: May 1881 – March 1882: Moscow, Kamenka, Naples
- Movements: 17
- Vocal: SATB choir

The All-Night Vigil for choir (Russian: Всенощное бдение для хора, Vsyenoshchnoye bdyeniye dlya khora), Op. 52, is an a cappella choral composition by Pyotr Ilyich Tchaikovsky, written from 1881 to 1882. It consists of settings of texts taken from the Russian Orthodox all-night vigil ceremony.

This work, like Sergei Rachmaninoff's All-Night Vigil, has been referred to as the Vespers. Like the Rachmaninoff, this is both literally and conceptually incorrect as applied to the entire work, as it contains settings from three canonical hours: Vespers, Matins and the First Hour.

== Background ==
Prior to Tchaikovsky's setting of the all-night vigil, the only setting in existence had been by Artemy Vedel in the 18th century. Russian church music underwent a period of stagnancy in the 18th and 19th centuries. This was partially attributed to the monopoly on its composition and performance held by Dmitry Bortniansky, while he was the director of the Imperial Chapel.

Tchaikovsky, known primarily for his symphonies, concertos and ballets, was deeply interested in the music and liturgy of the Russian Orthodox Church. Like Alexei Lvov before him, he deplored the increasingly Italian influence in church music as written by Bortniansky and Berezovsky, and sought a return to the old Russian style. He published a book in 1875, A Short Course of Harmony adapted for the Study of Russian Church Music.

In an 1877 letter to his friend Nadezhda von Meck, he wrote:

For me [the church] still possesses much poetical charm. I very often attend the services... If we follow the service very carefully, and enter into the meaning of every ceremony, it is impossible not to be profoundly moved by the liturgy of our own Orthodox Church. I also love vespers... to be startled from one's trance by a burst from the choir; to be carried away by the poetry of this music; to be thrilled when... the words ring out, 'Praise the name of the Lord!' – all this is infinitely precious to me! One of my deepest joys!

This passion manifested itself in 1878 in the composer's setting of the Liturgy of St. John Chrysostom, which church authorities banned from performance in churches after it was sung in a public concert. This did not dampen his interest in Russian choral music, and in May 1881 he requested his publisher and friend Pyotr Jurgenson for the text of the all-night vigil and Dmitry Razumovsky's Russian Church Songs. In the same year, Jurgenson asked him to edit the complete sacred works of Dmitry Bortniansky.

Editing Bortniansky's vast output was a formidable task, occupying Tchaikovsky from June to October 1881; he seems to have regretted the commission, ruefully asking "O, this Bortniansky! Why did he write so much!" He nevertheless retained his respect for the composer and sacred music, telling Jurgenson in June 1881 that he was writing church music in "an attempt (albeit a very modest one) to come to grips with the style established by Bortniansky and tutti quanti of others". In a letter to Eduard Nápravník, he specified this as a setting of the all-night vigil, stating his desire to improve upon the "untalented and banal" church music issuing from the Imperial Chapel.

Although the rough draft was complete by mid-late July, the completion of the work was delayed by his work on Bortniansky's compositions, and his own compositions such as Mazeppa and the Piano Trio. He completed it in March 1882 in Naples, and the first performance was held in Moscow in June 1882.

Tchaikovsky drew upon a huge body of traditional Slavonic chants for the work. The melody of the chant is usually used as the soprano line, with simple harmonisation for the alto, tenor and bass lines. He rarely departs from this homophonic style, save for brief polyphonic sections in the "Gladsome Light" and "Polyeleon" movements. This use of homophony shares similarities with German chorales.

== Legacy ==
Tchaikovsky's setting of the all-night vigil, the Divine Liturgy and his collection of nine sacred songs were of seminal importance in the later interest in Orthodox music in general, and settings of the all-night vigil in particular. Music had always been a fundamental aspect of the Orthodox Church, but previous Russian composers had largely ignored the "vast, almost untouched field" of sacred music, focusing on Western European genres such as the opera and the symphony. Composers like Glinka and Rimsky-Korsakov had contributed to the repertoire of sacred choral music, but did not approach it with the intention of producing large-scale works. Thus Tchaikovsky became the first major composer to use traditional Russian Orthodox chants as a basis for an entire liturgical cycle.

The twin attributes of Tchaikovsky's work, "free composition and polyphonic chant arrangement", as well as his extensive use of pre-existing Russian chants, served as a model for the next generation of Russian composers. Settings of the vigil by composers such as Chesnokov (1909 and 1913), Grechaninov (1912) and Ippolitov-Ivanov (1907) were all influenced by Tchaikovsky's work.

The most famous setting of the service, Rachmaninoff's All-Night Vigil, is a culmination of the two preceding decades of interest in Orthodox music, as initiated by Tchaikovsky. The similarities between the works, such as the extensive use of traditional chants, demonstrates the extent of Tchaikovsky's influence; however, Rachmaninoff's setting is much more complex in its use of harmony, textual variety and polyphony.

Tchaikovsky himself appears to have been disappointed with the work. In an 1881 letter to his friend and fellow composer Sergei Taneyev, he wrote "I am almost certain nothing in my Vespers will please you. I see nothing in them which would win your approval... I am no longer in a condition to compose." Another letter in 1891 to Jurgenson requested copies of his Liturgy and other sacred works, "with the exception of the Vespers".

== Structure ==
The work consists of 17 major divisions. Performances require approximately 45 minutes.

| Seq. | Church Slavonic (Russian transliteration) | English transliteration | English translation |
|---|---|---|---|
| 1 | «Благослови, душе моя» | Blagoslovi, dushe moya | Introductory psalm: "Bless the Lord, O my soul" |
| 2 | «Господи, помилуй» | Gospodi, pomilui | The Great Litany: "Lord, have mercy" (Kiev chant) and other brief responses |
| 3 | «Блажен муж» | Blazhen muzh | Kathisma: "Blessed is the man" |
| 3a | «Господи, помилуй» | Gospodi, pomilui | The Little Litany: "Lord, have mercy" (Znamenny chant) |
| 4 | «Господи, воззвах к Тебе» | Gospodi, vozzvakh k tyebe | "Lord, I call to Thee" |
| 5 | «Свете тихий» | Svyete tikhiy | "Gladsome Light" |
| 5a | «Господь воцарися» | Gospod' votsarisya | Prokeimenon :"The Lord reigns" |
| 6 | «Богородице, Дево, радуйся» | Bogoroditsye, Dyevo, raduisya | "Theotokos Virgin, rejoice" |
| 7 | «Бог Господь» | Bog Gospod' | "The Lord is God" |
| 8 | «Хвалите имя Господне» | Khvalite imya Gospodnye | Polyeleon: "Praise the Name of the Lord" |
| 9 | «Благословен еси Господи» | Blagoslovyen yesi, Gospodi | Troparia of the Resurrection: "Blessed art Thou, O Lord" |
| 9a | «Господи, помилуй» | Gospodi, pomilui | The Little Litany: "Lord have mercy" (Znamenny chant) |
| 10 | «От юности моея» | Ot iunosti moeia | Antiphon: "From my youth" |
| 11 | «Воскресение Христово видевше» | Voskreseniye Khristovo vidyevshe | Hymn: "Having beheld the Resurrection of Christ" |
| 11a | «Господи, помилуй» | Gospodi, pomilui | Prayer of Intercession: "Lord, have mercy" |
| 12 | «Отверзну уста моя» | Otverznu usta moya | Common Katavasia 1: "I shall open my lips" |
| 13 | «Величитъ душа моя Господа» | Velichit dusha moya Gospoda | Canticle of the Theotokos: "My soul doth magnify the Lord" |
| 13a | «Всяк земнородный» | Vsyak zyemnorodii | Common Katavasia 9: "Let all born on earth" |
| 14 | «Свят Господь Бог наш» | Svyat Gospod' Bog nash | "Holy is the Lord our God" |
| 15 | «И ныне и присно» | Ee nïne ee prisno | Theotokion of the Gospel Sticheron: "Both now and forever" |
| 16 | «Слава в вышних Богу» | Slava v vïshnikh Bogu | Great Doxology: "Glory to God in the highest" |
| 16a | «Честнейшую херувим» | Chestneshuyu kheruvim | At the dismissal – "More glorious than the cherubim" |
| 17 | «Взбранной Воеводе» | Vzbrannoy Voyevode | Kontakion: "To Thee, the victorious Leader" |
