= All-night vigil =

Eastern Christian church service

A symbol of Typikon

The all-night vigil is a service of the Eastern Orthodox and Byzantine Catholic churches consisting of an aggregation of the canonical hours of Compline (in Greek usage only), Vespers (or, on a few occasions, Great Compline), Matins, and the First Hour. This service may be performed (commencing the evening before) on any Sunday or major feast, any feast for which a Litia is prescribed; these feasts are marked in the Typikon and in liturgical calendars by a Greek cross printed in red in a properly shaped semicircle [open at the top]; this symbol is encoded in Unicode as U+1F541 (🕁).

== Order ==
When celebrated at the all-night vigil, the orders of Great Vespers and Matins vary somewhat from when they are celebrated separately. In parish usage, many portions of the service such as the readings from the Synaxarion during the Canon at Matins are abbreviated or omitted, and it therefore takes approximately two or two and a half hours to perform.

Note that the Psalms cited below are numbered according to the Septuagint, which differs from that found in the Masoretic.

=== Great Vespers ===
- Great Censing of the entire church by the priest with a deacon going before him holding a large candle. In Greek practice, this is during compline, but in Russian practice, in silence
- The opening blessing that is otherwise used for matins by the priest: "Glory to the holy, consubstantial, life-creating, and indivisible Trinity, always, now and ever, and unto ages of ages"
- "Come let us worship God our king" and "Psalm of creation", Psalm 103
- Great Litany
- First Kathisma, only the first stasis on a feast day, but in its entirely on a Sunday otherwise
- Little Litany
- "Lord I have cried" (psalms 140, 141, 129, 116), with appointed stichera, ending with the Dogmatic Theotokion, a hymn addressed to the Theotokos
- Entrance
- O gladsome light
- Prokeimenon for the day of the week
- Old Testament readings on a feast day
- Augmented Litany
- The prayer, "Vouchsafe, O Lord"
- Litany of Askings
- Litia on a feast day
- Aposticha
- Now lettest Thou thy servant depart in peace recited by the ecclesiarch (although sung in Russian parish usage)
- The Trisagion prayers
- Apolytikion appointed for the feast or on a Sundays otherwise, "Rejoice, O Virgin Theotokos..."
- Artoklasia if there was a Litia
- "Blessed be the name of the Lord", Psalm 33 (first ten verses), and a blessing by the priest

On the Eves of Nativity, Theophany, and the Annunciation, Great Compline is usually prescribed rather than Great Vespers.

=== Matins ===
- "Glory to God in the highest", "O Lord, open Thou my lips"
- Six Psalms (Psalms 3, 37, 61, 87, 102, and 142)
- Great Litany
- Theos Kyrios, verses from Psalm 117
- Apolytikion—on Sundays: from the Octoechos; otherwise, for the feast—and its appropriate Theotokion
- Kathisma
- Little Litany
- Sessional hymns
- Kathisma
- Little Litany
- Sessional hymns
- Polyeleon or Kathisma
- Megalynarion, in Russian usage, on a feast day
- Resurrectional Troparia, "The Angelic Council..." on Sundays and during Pascaltide
- Little Litany
- Anabathmoi
- Hypakoe
- Matins Prokeimenon
- Matins Gospel
- "Having beheld the Resurrection of Christ" on Sundays and during Pascaltide
- Psalm 50 ("Have mercy on me, O God", Miserere)
- Prayer by the priest, "O God save thy people and bless thine inheritance..."
- Canon
- Little Litany
- "Holy is the Lord our God" on Sundays
- Exapostilarion
- Praises (Psalms 148 to 150, with stichera)
- Great Doxology ("Glory to God in the highest")
- Appointed troparia
- Augmented Litany
- Litany of Askings
- Dismissal
- Polychronion
- First Hour

== Modern classical musical compositions ==
Besides numerous traditional chants of several schools, several major composers have created versions of the all-night vigil. The most famous of these is by Sergei Rachmaninoff, whose setting of selections from the service is one of his most admired works. Tchaikovsky's setting of the all-night vigil, along with his Divine Liturgy and his collection of nine sacred songs were of seminal importance in the later interest in Orthodox music in general, and settings of the all-night vigil in particular. Other musical settings include those by Chesnokov, Grechaninov, Ippolitov-Ivanov, Alexander Kastalsky, Clive Strutt and Einojuhani Rautavaara. It is most often celebrated using a variety of traditional or simplified chant melodies based on the Octoechos or other sources.

== Bibliography ==
- Perrie, Maureen; Lieven, Dominic; Suny, Ronald G., eds. (2006). The Cambridge History of Russia: Volume 2, Imperial Russia, 1689-1917. Cambridge University Press. ISBN 9780521815291.
- Swain, Joseph P. (2006). The A to Z of Sacred Music. Rowman & Littlefield. ISBN 9780810876217.
- Morozan, Vladimir (2013). "Russian Choral Repertoire". In Di Grazia, Donna M (ed.). Nineteenth-Century Choral Music. Routledge. ISBN 9781136294099.
