= All-Night Vigil (Rachmaninoff) =

1915 a cappella choral composition by Sergei Rachmaninoff

- Sacred choral music by Sergei Rachmaninoff
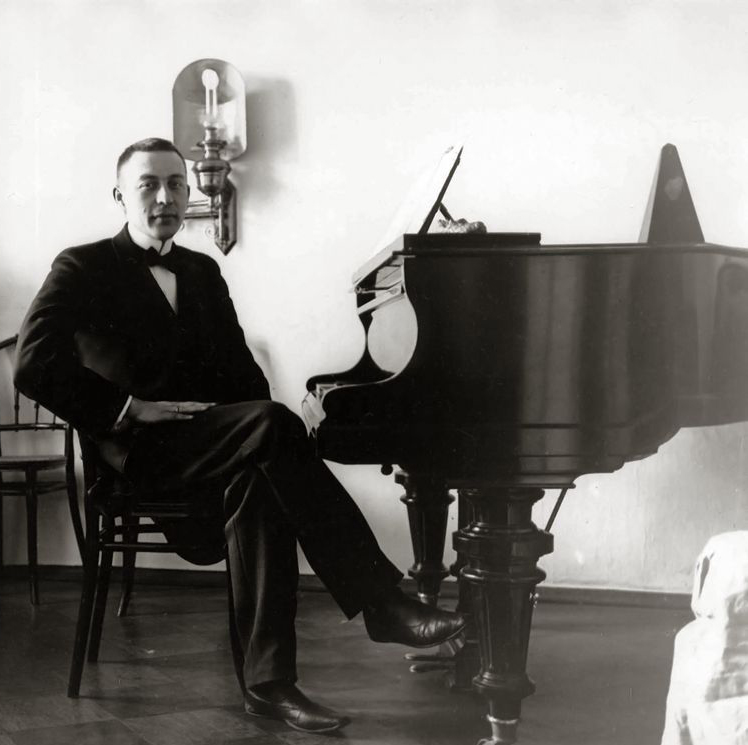
- The composer
- Opus: 37
- Text: All-night vigil
- Language: Church Slavonic
- Dedication: Stepan Smolensky
- Performed: 23 March 1915: Moscow
- Movements: 15
- Scoring: SATB choir

The All-Night Vigil (Pre-reform Russian: Всенощное бдѣніе, Vsénoshchnoye bdéniye; Modern Russian: Всенощное бдение) is an a cappella choral composition by Sergei Rachmaninoff, his Op. 37, premiered on 10/23 March 1915 in Moscow.

The piece consists of settings of texts taken from the Russian Orthodox All-night vigil ceremony. It has been praised as Rachmaninoff's finest achievement and "the greatest musical achievement of the Russian Orthodox Church". It was one of Rachmaninoff's two favorite compositions along with The Bells, and the composer requested that its fifth movement (Нынѣ отпущаеши, Nunc dimittis) be sung at his funeral.

The title of the work is often mis-translated as Vespers. This is both literally and conceptually incorrect as applied to the entire work; only the first six of its fifteen movements set texts from the Russian Orthodox canonical hour of Vespers.

== History ==
=== Composition history ===
Rachmaninoff composed the All-Night Vigil in less than two weeks in January and February 1915. The All-Night Vigil is perhaps notable as one of two liturgical settings (the other being the Liturgy of St. John Chrysostom) by a composer who had stopped attending church services. As required by the Russian Orthodox Church, Rachmaninoff based ten of the fifteen sections on chant. However, the five original sections (numbers 1, 3, 6, 10, & 11) were so heavily influenced by chant that the composer called them "conscious counterfeits".

Rachmaninoff's work is a culmination of the preceding two decades of interest in Russian sacred music, as initiated by Tchaikovsky's setting of the all-night vigil. The similarities between the works, such as the extensive use of traditional chants, demonstrates the extent of Tchaikovsky's influence; however, Rachmaninoff's setting is much more complex in its use of harmony, textual variety and polyphony.

=== Performance history ===
The first performance was given in Moscow on 10/23 March 1915, partly to benefit the Russian war effort. Nikolai Danilin conducted the all-male Moscow Synodal Choir at the premiere. It was received warmly by critics and audiences alike, and was so successful that it was performed five more times within a month. However the Russian Revolution of 1917 and the rise of the Soviet Union led to the government condemnation of religious music, and on 22 July 1918 the Synodal Choir was replaced by a non-religious "People's Choir Academy". It has been written that "no composition represents the end of an era so clearly as this liturgical work".

Individual movements of Rachmaninoff’s Vigil are incorporated by conductors into the actual sacred performance, or celebration (to use the proper Orthodox term), of the All-Night Vigil. On the night of April 2, 2022, Metropolitan Hilarion Alfeyev, celebrated a hierarchical All-Night Vigil that included all of the movements of Rachmaninoff’s work, incorporated with the complete order of the service.

== Analysis ==
The Vigil includes three styles of chant: znamenny (in numbers 8, 9, 12, 13 and 14), a more recitational Greek style (numbers 2 and 15), and "Kiev" chant — a chant developed in Kiev in the 16th and 17th centuries (numbers 4 and 5). Before writing, Rachmaninoff had studied ancient chant under Stepan Smolensky, to whom he dedicated the piece. It is written for a four-part choir, complete with basso profondo. However, in many parts there is three-, five-, six-, or eight-part harmony; at one point in the seventh movement, the choir is divided into eleven parts. Movements 4 and 9 each contain a brief tenor solo, while movements 2 and 5 feature lengthy solos respectively for alto and tenor. The fifth movement, Nunc dimittis (Nyne otpushchayeshi), has gained notoriety for its ending in which the low basses must negotiate a descending scale that ends with a low B-flat (the third B-flat below middle C). When Rachmaninoff initially played this passage through to Kastalsky and Danilin in preparation for the first performance, Rachmaninoff recalled that:

Danilin shook his head, saying, "Now where on earth are we to find such basses? They are as rare as asparagus at Christmas!" Nevertheless, he did find them. I knew the voices of my countrymen...

== Movements ==
Note: Numbers 1–6 contain settings from the Russian Orthodox Vespers service (Russian: Вечерня, Večérnja), numbers 7–14 settings from Matins (Утреня, Útrenja), and number 15 from The First Hour (Первый час, Pérvyj čas).

Seq.	Church Slavonic	Transliteration	English equivalent
1	Пріидите, поклонимся.	Priidite, poklonimsya.	Come, Let Us Worship.
2	Благослови, душе моя, Господа. Греческаго распѣва.	Blagoslovi, dushe moya, Gospoda. Grecheskago raspeva.	Bless the Lord, O My Soul. Greek Chant.
3	Блаженъ мужъ.	Blazhen muzh.	Blessed is the Man.
4	Свѣте тихій. Кiевскаго распѣва.	Svete tikhiy. Kievskago raspeva.	O Gladsome Light. Kyiv Chant.
5	Нынѣ отпущаеши. Кiевскаго распѣва.	Nïne otpushchayeshi. Kievskago raspeva.	Now Lettest Thou. Kyiv Chant.
6	Богородице Дѣво.	Bogoroditse Devo.	Rejoice, O Virgin.
7	Слава въ вышнихъ Богу (шестопсалміе).	Slava v vïshnikh Bogu (shestopsalmiye).	Glory To God in the Highest (the six psalms).
8	Хвалите Имя Господне. Знаменнаго распѣва.	Khvalite Imya Gospodne. Znamennago raspeva.	Praise the Name of the Lord. Znamennïy Chant.
9	Благословенъ еси, Господи. Знаменнаго распѣва.	Blagosloven yesi, Gospodi. Znamennago raspeva.	Blessed Art Thou, O Lord. Znamennïy Chant.
10	Воскресеніе Христово видѣвше.	Voskreseniye Khristovo videvshe.	Having Beheld the Resurrection of Christ.
11	Величитъ душа моя Господа.	Velichit dusha moya Gospoda.	My Soul Doth Magnify the Lord.
12	Великое славословіе. Знаменнаго распѣва.	Velikoye slavosloviye. Znamennago raspeva.	The Great Doxology. Znamennïy Chant.
13	Тропарь. Днесь спасеніе. Знаменнаго распѣва.	Tropar'. Dnes spaseniye. Znamennago raspeva.	Troparion. Today Salvation is Come. Znamennïy Chant.
14	Тропарь. Воскресъ изъ гроба. Знаменнаго распѣва.	Tropar'. Voskres iz groba. Znamennago raspeva.	Troparion. Thou Didst Rise from the Tomb. Znamennïy Chant.
15	Взбранной воеводѣ. Греческаго распѣва.	Vzbrannoy voyevode. Grecheskago raspeva.	To Thee, Victorious Leader. Greek Chant.

== Recordings ==
The first recording of the Vigil was made by Aleksandr Sveshnikov with the State Academic Russian Choir of the USSR for the Soviet Melodiya label in 1965 – exactly half a century after the work's first performance. Because of Soviet anti-religious policies, this record was never available for sale within the USSR, but was only made for the export market and private study. This recording still has a legendary reputation, in part because of its extremely strong low basses, but also because of the solos by Klara Korkan and Konstantin Ognevoi. The recording was first released in the United States in 1973 on the Melodiya-Angel label. The March 1974 edition of Stereo Review noted that Angel's general manager Robert E. Myers had "tracked down the recording" and "had to prevail rather heavily on the Soviet powers that be to make it part of their trade agreement with Angel".

Year	Conductor	Choir	Soloists	Label
1965	Aleksandr Sveshnikov	State Academic Russian Choir of the USSR	Klara Korkan (mezzo-soprano); Konstantin Ognevoy (tenor)	Melodiya
1967	Karl Linke	Johannes-Damascenus-Chor für Ostkirchliche Liturgie	Marie-Louise Gilles; Günter Schmitz	Christophorus
1978	Georgi Robev	Svetoslav Obretenov Choir	Natalia Peneva (alto); Todor Grigorov-Tres (tenor)	Vanguard
1983	Yevgeny Svetlanov	Svetoslav Obretenov Choir		Russian Disc
1984	Kenneth Montgomery	Groot Omroepkoor	Wil Boekel (alto); Frank Hameleers (tenor)	KRO-klassiek
1986	Valery Polyansky	Chamber Choir of the Ministry of Culture of the USSR	Irina Arkhipova (mezzo-soprano); Viktor Rumantsev (tenor); Yuriy Vishnyakov (basso profundo)	Melodiya/Moscow Studio Archives
1986	Vladislav Chernushenko	St. Petersburg Cappella	Zhanna Polevtsova (mezzo-soprano); Sergei Rokozitsa (tenor)	Chant du Monde/IML
1987	Mstislav Rostropovich	Choral Arts Society of Washington	Maureen Forrester (mezzo-soprano); Gene Tucker (tenor)	Erato
1989	Robert Shaw	The Robert Shaw Festival Singers	Karl Dent (tenor)	Telarc
1990	Matthew Best	Corydon Singers	Joya Logan (alto); John Bowen (tenor)	Hyperion
1991	Oleg Shepel	Voronezh State Institute of Arts Chamber Choir	Yelena Necheporenko (mezzo-soprano); Aleksandr Zlobin (tenor); Ruben Sevostyanov (tenor); Aleksandr Nazarov (bass)	Globe
1993	David Hill	The Philharmonia Chorus	Sarah Fryer (mezzo-soprano); Peter Butterfield (tenor)	Nimbus
1993	Nikolai Korniev	St. Petersburg Chamber Choir	Olga Borodina (alto); Vladimir Mostovoy (tenor)	Philips
1994	Josef Pancik	Prague Chambrer Choir		Discover
1994	Robin Gritton	Berlin Radio Chorus	Tatjana Sotin (alto); Thomas Kober (tenor)	CPO
1994	Tõnu Kaljuste	Swedish Radio Choir	Malena Ernman (alto); Per Björslund (tenor); Nils Högman (tenor)	Virgin
1994	Georgi Robev	Bulgarian National Choir		Capriccio
1995	William Hall	William Hall Master Chorale	Jonathan Mack (tenor)	
1997	Aleksey Puzakov	Choir of St Nicholas Church Tolmachi	Tatiana Gerange (alto); Dmitriy Borisov (tenor); Nikolay Sokolov (archpriest)	Boheme
1998	Stephen Cleobury	Choir of King's College, Cambridge	Margaret Cameron (alto); Richard Eteson (Tenor); James Gilchrist (tenor); Jan Lochmann (bass)	EMI
1998	Karen P. Thomas	Seattle Pro Musica	Yelena Posrednikov (alto); Stuart Lutzenhiser (tenor); Misha Myznikov (baritone)	
1998	Roger McMurrin	The Kyiv Symphonic Choir	Valentyna Svitylnyk (mezzo-soprano); Anatoliy Glavin (tenor)	Music Kiev
2000	Aleksandr Govorov	Accordance (male choir)	Dmitriy Popov (tenor); Vladimir Pasyukov (basso Profundo)	
2000	Yevhen Savchuk	Ukrainian National Capella "Dumka"	Olga Borusene (soprano); Mykhaylo Tyshchenko (tenor); Yuri Korinnyk (tenor)	Regis/Brilliant Classics
2000	Howard Arman	Leipzig Radio Chorus	Klaudia Zeiner (alto); Mikhail Agafonov (tenor); Lew Maidarschewski (bass)	Berlin Classics
2000	Torsten Mariegaard	Copenhagen Oratorio Choir	Lotte Hovman (alto); Poul Emborg (tenor)	Classico
2001	Jaroslav Brych	Prague Philharmonic Chorus		Praga
2003	Dale Warland	Dale Warland Singers		Rezound
2004	Eric-Olof Söderström	Finnish National Opera Chorus	Raissa Palmu (soprano); Erja Wimeri (contralto); Eugen Antoni (tenor)	Naxos
2004	Paul Hillier	Estonian Philharmonic Chamber Choir	Iris Oja (alto); Vladimir Miller (bass); Mati Turi (tenor); Tiit Kogerman (tenor)	Harmonia Mundi
2004	Nigel Short	Tenebrae	Frances Jellard (alto); Paul Badley (tenor)	Signum U.k.
2004	Michael Gläserri	Chor des Bayerischen Rundfunks	Theresa Blank (alto); Anton Rosner (tenor)	Oehms
2005	Thomas Edward Morgan	Ars Nova Singers	Adam Finkel (tenor); J.R. Humbert (tenor); Philip Judge (bass); Brian du Fresne (chimes)	New Art Recordings
2007	Marcus Creed	SWR Vokalensemble Stuttgart		Hänssler
2008	Viktor Popov	Academy of Choral Art, Moscow	A. Timofeeva (mezzo-soprano); D. Kortchak (tenor)	Delos
2010	Pasi Hyökki	Talla Vocal Ensemble		Fuga
2012	Sigvards Kļava	Latvian Radio Choir		Ondine
2012	Andrew Clark	Harvard-Radcliffe Collegium Musicum		
2013	Kevin Fox	Pacific Boychoir	William Lundquist (alto); Zachary Salsburg-Frank (alto); Sam Siegel (alto)	
2013	Peter Broadbent	Joyful Company of Singers	Lorna Perry (alto); Andrew Shepstone (tenor)	Nimbus Records
2014	Teemu Honkanen	Key Ensemble	Kristina Raudanen (alto); Mats Lillhannus (tenor); Reino Kotaviita (bass)	Fuga
2014	Kaspars Putniņš	Netherlands Radio Choir	Matthew Minter; Pierrette de Zwaan; Eyjólfur Eyjólfsson; Gert-Jan Alders	BIS
2014	Charles Bruffy	Phoenix Chorale and Kansas City Chorale	Frank Fleschner (tenor); Julia Scozzafava (mezzo-soprano); Paul Davidson (bass); Toby Vaughn Kidd (bass); Bryan Pinkall (tenor); Bryan Taylor (bass); Joseph Warner (bass)	Chandos Records
2016	Nicolas Fink	WDR Rundfunkchor	Beate Koepp (alto); Kwon-Shik Lee (tenor)	Clarus
2016	Janos Dobra	Budapest Tomkins Vocal Ensemble	Judit Rajk (contralto); Tamas Dubno (tenor)	Hungaroton
2016	Stefan Parkman	Academy Chamber Choir of Uppsala	Patrik Wallin (tenor); Annika Hudak (mezzo-soprano)	Footprint Records
2017	Risto Joost	MDR Rundfunkchor	Klaudia Zeiner (alto); Falk Hoffmann (tenor)	Genuin
2017	Marcel Verhoeff	Great Russian Academic Boys- and Malechoir	Olga Marinova (alto); Nikolay Almazov (tenor)	VMS
2017	Peter Jermihov	The Gloriæ Dei Cantores with members of: St. Romanos Cappella, The Patriarch Tikhon Choir, The Washington Master Chorale	Mariya Berezovska (alto); Dmitry Ivanchenko (tenor); Vadim Gan (clergy exclamations)	Gloriae Dei Cantores Recordings
2017	Jeremy Backhouse	Vasari Singers	Catherine Wyn-Rogers (alto); Adam Tunnicliffe (tenor)	VasariMedia
2018	Irina Bogdanovich	University of Warsaw Choir	Jadwiga Rappé (alto); Mateusz Markuszewski (tenor)	
2018	Violetta Bielecka	Choir of the Podlaskie Opera and Philharmonic	Agnieszka Rehlis (mezzo-soprano); Rafal Bartminski (tenor); Krzysztof Drugow (bass)	Dux Recording Producers
2020	David Wolfswinkel	Koorinsident	Minette du Toit-Pearce (alto); Vasti Zeeman-Knoessen (alto); Nathan Zachary Lewis (tenor)	Koorinsident Recordings 2021 Michael Slon University Singers of Virginia and the Virginia Oratorio Society
2023	Joseph Fort	Choir of King's College London	Caitlin Goreing (alto); Chris O'Leary (tenor)	Delphian Records
2023	Steven Fox	The Clarion Choir		Pentatone
2023	Andrei Petrenko	Yekaterinburg Philharmonic Choir	Diliza Nadyrova (alto); Victor Galler (tenor); Dmitry Kharpov (tenor)	Fuga Libera
2024	Ekaterina Antonenko	PaTRAM Institute Male Choir	Igor Morozov (tenor); Evgeny Kachurovsky (baritone); Alexis V. Lukianov (octavist)	Chandos Records
2026	Peter Dijkstraa	Chor des Bayerischen Rundfunks	Kerstin Rosenfeldt (alto) Heejoon Lee (tenor)	BR Klassik

== In popular culture ==
The Russian feminist protest punk rock group Pussy Riot used the sixth movement as the basis for its protest song "Mother of God, Chase Putin Away".

"Khvalitye Imya Gospodnye" appears in the film My Best Friend's Wedding.
