= Francis Pott (composer) =

British composer, pianist and academic

- Born: Francis John Dolben Pott; 1957 (age 68–69); England
- Occupations: Composer; Pianist; Academic teacher

Francis John Dolben Pott (born 25 August 1957) is a British composer, pianist and academic.

== Life ==
Following early training as a chorister at New College, Pott held open music scholarships at Winchester College and Magdalene College, Cambridge, studying composition at the latter with Robin Holloway and Hugh Wood while also pursuing piano studies as a private pupil of the late Hamish Milne in London. He holds BA, BMus and MA degrees from the University of Cambridge and a PhD from the University of West London, as well as a Fellowship of London College of Music (FLCM) and a Principal Fellowship of the Higher Education Academy (PFHEA). He was a member of Winchester Cathedral Choir under David Hill from 1991 until 2001, touring the USA, the Netherlands, Brazil, Germany, France and Norway and also participating in many CD recordings and broadcasts

For many years Pott was John Bennett Lecturer in Music at St Hilda's College, Oxford. In 2001 he was appointed administrative and academic head of the London College of Music, one of the eight schools within the University of West London. He later became head of both composition and research development in music, media and creative technologies, and in February 2007 was appointed to the university's first Chair of Composition. He occupied this post until his retirement on 31 August 2023. The University of West London will formally confer upon Pott the title professor emeritus at its graduation ceremonies in November 2023. Pott is now devoting substantially more time to composition.

Pott has received many national awards as a composer and in 1997 gained first prize in the second S. S. Prokofiev International Composing Competition in Moscow. In the 2004 Barlow International Composition Award (USA) he was placed second out of a global entry by 362 composers, receiving an honorable mention. In both 2006 and 2011 he was a nominated as a finalist in the choral section of the BASCA Annual Composer Awards in London. In 2020 he was announced as recipient of the Medal of the Royal College of Organists - its highest award - in recognition of distinguished achievement as a composer of organ and sacred choral music.

In February 2008 Pott was a keynote speaker alongside James MacMillan and Jonathan Harvey at the Contemporary Music and Spirituality conference convened at the South Bank Centre in London by Robert Sholl for the London College of Music, in association with the Royal Musical Association.

Pott has appeared frequently as a two-piano duo recitalist with Jeremy Filsell and Roger Owens. He is writing an extended critical study of the works of the Russian composer Nikolai Medtner, on whose music he is an authority. His existing publications in prose include a chapter on his own music in the book 'Contemporary Music and Spirituality', edited by Robert Sholl and Sander van Maas (Routledge, London & New York, 2016; ISBN 978-1-4094-4058-1).

Pott lives near Winchester in Hampshire. His two adult children have both followed in his musical footsteps.

== Works ==
Pott's works have been performed and broadcast in over 40 countries worldwide, issued extensively on CD and published by five major houses in the UK. His monumental organ symphony Christus was described in 1992 as "one of the most important organ works of our century", and in 1999 as "an astonishingly original composition, compelling in its structural logic and exhilarating in performance: a stupendous achievement". His oratorio A Song on the End of the World, named after a Czesław Miłosz poem from Nazi-occupied Warsaw and written as the last pre-millennial Elgar Commission of the Three Choirs Festival at Worcester, was hailed as "thrilling, apocalyptic and profoundly affecting". It was revived at the Festival in 2023.

His 89-minute oratorio for tenor solo, double chorus and organ, The Cloud of Unknowing, received international acclaim following its premiere in May 2006 at the London Festival of Contemporary Church Music (James Gilchrist, tenor, Jeremy Filsell, organ, and the Vasari Singers under their conductor, Jeremy Backhouse) and the CD release by the same artists in September 2007 (Signum Records). In January 2012 Naxos released Pott's sacred choral works, performed by the Oxford-based chamber choir Commotio under the direction of Matthew Berry.

Pott's piano music is championed by the Russian-Canadian virtuoso Alexander Tselyakov, and his organ works by the British organist Jeremy Filsell. Other works include sonatas for violin, viola and cello (one for each, all with piano) and many songs, including song cycles. Further works for chorus and orchestra include 'The Lost Wand' (2015, setting texts by Hermann Hesse, Karen Gershon and Vernon Scannell – the title is taken from a line of Scannell's) and 'Cantus Maris' (2016, incorporating an important solo part for mezzo-soprano).

In December 2013 Pott signed an exclusive contract with Peters Edition in London, to cover all his future choral and organ work and items from his back catalogue that remain unpublished. His piano and chamber music is published by Composers Edition.

Pott's 'Cantus Maris' [Sea Requiem for mezzo-soprano solo, chorus and orchestra] was premiered at the Royal Festival Hall, Southbank Centre, London, in May 2017. Among his recent works, a further Requiem-based work, 'At First Light' for chorus a cappella and cello solo, was globally released in 2020 and was a nominee for the US Grammy Awards.

As of 2023, Pott's recent compositional projects include a 42-minute violin concerto, as yet unperformed owing to the ramifications of Covid and lockdown; also Tandem, a 25-minute two piano work in three movements, premiered by the composer with Jeremy Filsell in New York, October 2022. Current and future projects include a concerto for Cor Anglais and small orchestra, a concert overture entitled Hocket Science, and a large-scale symphony.
