= Stepan Smolensky =

Russian music scholar (1848–1909)

Stepan Vasil'evich Smolensky (Russian: Сте́пан Васи́льевич Смоле́нский; 15 October 1848 – 1 August 1909) was a choir director and scholar of ancient Russian chant.

Smolensky was a graduate of the Faculties of Jurisprudence and Philology of Kazan University; during his studies, he had also taken private lessons on violin and piano. From the early 1870s he made a study of ancient church chant, publishing several books on znamenny chant and a catalogue of the musical manuscripts held in the library of the Solovetsky Monastery.

In 1889 he settled in Moscow, becoming professor of history and theory of church music at the Conservatory after the death of Dmitri Razumovsky. Simultaneously he became director of the Synod choir and the Moscow Synodal School, succeeding Vasily Sergeevich Orlov: his success in these posts resulted in his being appointed director of the Saint Petersburg Court Capella on 6/19 May 1901, a post he held until 1903.

The 1915 choral composition All-Night Vigil, by Sergei Rachmaninoff, was dedicated to Smolensky.
