= Phos Hilaron =

Ancient Christian hymn

Phos Hilaron (Koine Greek: Φῶς Ἱλαρόν, romanized: Fōs Ilaron) is an ancient Christian hymn originally written in Koine Greek. Often referred to in the Western Church by its Latin title Lumen Hilare, it has been translated into English as O Gladsome Light. It is one of the earliest known Christian hymns recorded outside of the Bible that is still in use today. The hymn is part of vespers in the Eastern Orthodox Church and the Byzantine Rite of the Catholic Church, and also included in some Anglican liturgies and Lutheran hymnals.

== Origins ==
The hymn was first recorded by an unknown author in the Apostolic Constitutions, which was written in the late 3rd or early 4th century. It is found in a collection of songs to be sung in the morning, evening, before meals, and at candle lighting.

Phos Hilaron is to be sung at the lighting of lamps in the evening, giving it the alternate name as the "Lamplighting Hymn". Despite some of the words to the other three songs being from Scripture or in one case dated to around 150, Phos Hilaron is the first to be considered an actual hymn in the modern sense, stylistically more rhythmic in its structure (divided into twelve verses varying between five, six, eight, nine, ten and eleven syllables per verse). Basil of Caesarea (329–379) spoke of the singing of the Phos Hilaron as a cherished tradition of the church, the hymn being already considered old in his day (though some attribute the composition of the song to Basil himself). The original melody, as used by the Greek Orthodox Church in the original text, is considered taxing on the voice as it spans almost two octaves, with the voice peaking on the words "Heavenly" and "the Father" (see word painting).

Around the hymn's creation date, traditionally in Jerusalem, a lamp was kept perpetually burning in the empty tomb of Christ, its glow a symbol of the living light of Jesus. As Christians gathered to worship, the hymn was sung; in a tradition known as the lighting of the lamps, a candle lit from the lamp was brought forth from the tomb, its bright, solitary flame calling the church to celebrate the Risen Lord.

Athenogenes of Pedachtoë, a saint of unknown date but whose saint's day is 16 July, is believed by some to have composed this hymn on the way to being martyred. He is often depicted as an elderly bishop with the executioner's arm paralyzed until the saint has completed his song. The Roman Martyrology states: "In Pontus, the birthday of Saint Athenogenes, [is celebrated. He was] an aged theologian, who, when about to consummate his martyrdom by fire, sang a hymn of joy, which he left in writing to his disciples." His story and personhood closely resemble a bishop who was martyred with ten disciples in Sebaste, Armenia on July 16, during the reign of Emperor Diocletian, most probably c. A.D. 305.

Sophronius of Jerusalem (560− 638), who was known for his poetry, is believed to have revised the hymn; Orthodox liturgical books often identify him as the author.

== Modern usage ==
=== Orthodox Christianity ===
The hymn is a fixed part of the Orthodox vespers service, sung or recited daily, at the entrance when great vespers is celebrated and, in all cases, after the "lamp lighting psalms" ("Lord, I have cried..."), and their stichera, and immediately preceding the prokeimenon.

=== Armenian Rite ===
In the Armenian Rite the hymn is sung only on Saturday evening (i.e., Sunday Eve) and on the eve of certain feast days. The name of the text in Armenian is Luys Zvart.

=== Anglicanism ===
The hymn was translated into English by John Keble, one of the leaders of the Oxford Movement within Anglicanism, in 1834, as "Hail, Gladdening Light". Because Keble retained the original irregular metre, it was not suited to any existing hymn tune; however, Sir John Stainer wrote music specifically for it based on Anglican chant. His tune, Sebaste, was first published in 1875 in Hymns Ancient and Modern, while Stainer was organist at St Paul's Cathedral, London. Keble's version was also set as an anthem for eight voices by Charles Wood in 1912. Another translation was made by the 19th-century U.S. poet Henry Wadsworth Longfellow; a third translation, by Robert Bridges ("O gladsome light, O grace / Of God the Father's face"), has appeared in several hymnals with music composed by Louis Bourgeois.

The traditional Anglican service of Evening Prayer did not call for the use of the hymn, though different versifications of the hymn could be sung at points in the service which provided for the singing of a hymn or anthem.

More recently, some Anglican bodies have adopted it as part of the evening liturgy. The 1979 American Book of Common Prayer prescribes it, in the prose translation given below, as an optional invitatory canticle immediately preceding the psalms appointed for the day.

=== Lutheranism ===
The Lutheran Service Book (the official hymnal of the Lutheran Church – Missouri Synod) contains, for the liturgy of early evening prayer, the Phos Hilaron.

== Lyrics ==
=== Greek ===
Original text
Φῶς ἱλαρὸν ἁγίας δόξης ἀθανάτου Πατρός,
οὐρανίου, ἁγίου, μάκαρος, Ἰησοῦ Χριστέ,
ἐλθόντες ἐπὶ τὴν ἡλίου δύσιν, ἰδόντες φῶς ἑσπερινόν,
ὑμνοῦμεν Πατέρα, Υἱόν, καὶ ἅγιον Πνεῦμα, Θεόν.
Ἄξιόν σε ἐν πᾶσι καιροῖς ὑμνεῖσθαι φωναῖς αἰσίαις,
Υἱὲ Θεοῦ, ζωὴν ὁ διδούς· διὸ ὁ κόσμος σὲ δοξάζει.

Transliteration
Phō̂s hilaròn hagías dóxēs, athanátou Patrós,
ouraníou, hagíou, mákaros, Iēsoû Christé,
elthóntes epì tḕn hēlíou dýsin, idóntes phôs hesperinón,
hymnoûmen Patéra, Hyión, kaì Hágion Pneûma, Theón.
Áxión se en pâsi kairoîs hymneîsthai phōnaîs aisíais,
Hyiè Theoû, zoḕn ho didoús, diò ho kósmos sè doxázei.

Verbatim translation

O Light gladsome of the holy glory of the Immortal Father,
the Heavenly, the Holy, the Blessed, O Jesus Christ,
having come upon the setting of the sun, having seen the light of the evening,
we praise the Father, the Son, and the Holy Spirit: God.
Worthy it is at all times to praise Thee in joyful voices,
O Son of God, Giver of Life, for which the world glorifies Thee.

=== English ===
==== Eastern Orthodox ====
===== Orthodox Church in America =====
O Gladsome Light of the Holy Glory of the Immortal Father, Heavenly, Holy, Blessed Jesus Christ! Now that we have come to the setting of the sun and behold the light of evening, we praise God Father, Son and Holy Spirit. For meet it is at all times to worship Thee with voices of praise. O Son of God and Giver of Life, therefore all the world doth glorify Thee.

===== Russian Orthodox Church Outside Russia =====
O Gentle Light of the holy glory of the immortal, heavenly, holy, blessed Father, O Jesus Christ: Having come to the setting of the sun, having beheld the evening light, we praise the Father, the Son, and the Holy Spirit: God. Meet it is for Thee at all times to be hymned with reverent voices, O Son of God, Giver of life. Wherefore, the world doth glorify Thee.

==== Eastern Catholic ====
===== Melkite Catholic Church =====
O Joyful Light of the holy glory of the Father immortal: heavenly, holy, blessed Lord Jesus Christ! Since we have come to the setting of the sun and have seen the evening light, we praise God the Father, the Son and the Holy Spirit. It is proper for You to be praised at all times by fitting melodies, O Son of God, giver of life. Therefore, all the world glorifies You!

===== Ruthenian Catholic Church =====
O Joyful Light of the holy glory of the Father Immortal, the heavenly, holy, blessed One, O Jesus Christ, now that we have reached the setting of the sun, and see the evening light, we sing to God, Father, Son, and Holy Spirit (+). It is fitting at all times to raise a song of praise in measured melody to you, O Son of God, the Giver of Life. Therefore, the universe sings your glory.

===== Ukrainian Catholic Church =====
O Joyful Light, light and holy glory of the Father Immortal, the heavenly, holy, blessed One, O Jesus Christ, now that we have reached the setting of the sun, and see the evening light, we sing to God, Father, Son, and Holy Spirit (+). It is fitting at all times to raise a song of praise in measured melody to you, O Son of God, the Giver of Life. Behold, the universe sings your glory.

==== Sundry others ====
===== Book of Common Prayer (1979) =====
O gracious Light,
pure brightness of the everliving Father in heaven,
O Jesus Christ, holy and blessed!

Now as we come to the setting of the sun,
and our eyes behold the vesper light,
we sing thy praises, O God: Father, Son, and Holy Spirit.

[Thou art/You are] worthy at all times to be praised by happy voices,
O Son of God, O Giver of life,
and to be glorified through all the worlds.

===== Lutheran Church – Missouri Synod =====
Joyous light of glory of the immortal Father,
Heavenly, holy, blessed Jesus Christ,
We have come to the setting of the Sun
And we look to the evening light.
We sing to God, the Father, Son and Holy Spirit.
You are worthy of being praised with pure voices forever.
O Son of God, O Giver of life,
The universe proclaims your glory.

===== by John Keble =====
Hail, gladdening Light, of His pure glory poured
Who is the immortal Father, heavenly, blest,
Holiest of Holies, Jesus Christ our Lord!

Now we are come to the sun's hour of rest;
The lights of evening round us shine;
We hymn the Father, Son, and Holy Spirit divine!

Worthiest art Thou at all times to be sung
With undefiled tongue,
Son of our God, Giver of life, alone:
Therefore in all the world Thy glories, Lord, they own.

===== by Robert Bridges =====
O gladsome light, O grace
Of God the Father's face,
The eternal splendour wearing;
Celestial, holy, blest,
Our Saviour Jesus Christ,
Joyful in thine appearing.

Now, ere day fadeth quite,
We see the evening light,
Our wonted hymn outpouring;
Father of might unknown,
Thee, his incarnate Son,
And Holy Spirit adoring.

To thee of right belongs
All praise of holy songs,
O Son of God, Lifegiver;
Thee, therefore, O Most High,
The world doth glorify,
And shall exalt forever.

===== by William Storey =====
Used in the Office of the Dead and at Evening Prayer.

O radiant light, O sun divine
Of God the Father's deathless face,
O image of the light sublime
That fills the heav'nly dwelling place.

O Son of God, the source of life,
Praise is your due by night and day;
Our happy lips must raise the strain
Of your esteemed and splendid name.

Lord Jesus Christ, as daylight fades,
As shine the lights of eventide,
We praise the Father with the Son,
The Spirit blest and with them one.

[Storey did not preserve the ancient text-order by which the doxology occurs in v. 2 rather than v. 3]

===== Alternative version used in the Episcopal Church =====
Light of the world in grace and beauty,
mirror of God's eternal face,
transparent flame of love's free duty,
you bring salvation to our race.
Now, as we see the lights of evening,
we raise our voice in hymns of praise;
worthy are you of endless blessing,
Sun of our night, Lamp of our days.

== Musical settings ==
=== With online notes or audio ===
Tradition or composer	Language	Text with musical notation	Audio	Remarks
Byzantine Chant	English	PDF – Western notation; 2 parts (melody and ison) (PDF)	MP3 – 2 parts (melody and ison); MIDI	Tone plagal 1
Byzantine Chant	English	PDF – Byzantine neumes (PDF), archived from the original (PDF) on 6 April 2012	MIDI	Tone 2 adapted from version attributed to John Sakellarides as chanted on the Holy Mountain
Byzantine Chant	English	PDF – Byzantine neumes (PDF), archived from the original (PDF) on 6 April 2012	MIDI	Tone 2 adapted from Ancient Melody as abbreviated by Socrates Papadopoulos
Carpatho-Russian Chant	English	PDF – 4-part harmony (PDF), archived from the original (PDF) on 26 April 2012		
Carpatho-Russian Chant	English	PDF – 2 parts (PDF)	MP3 – 2 parts MIDI	Arranged by Fr. Lawrence Margitich (Old Version)
Carpatho-Russian Chant	English	PDF – 2 parts (PDF)		Arranged by Fr. Lawrence Margitich (New Version)
Valaam Chant	English	PDF – 2 parts (PDF)	MP3 – 2 parts MIDI	
Znamenny Chant	English	PDF – Includes 2nd part in Treble Clef for Altos (PDF)	MP3 – Vocal; MIDI	Tone 5 – 'Tikhonovsky Chant' based on Znamenny Chant
Znamenny Chant	English	PDF – 2 parts (PDF)	MIDI	Tone 7 – Great Znamenny Chant – difficult
Alexander Kopylov (1854–1911)	Slavonic	PDF – 4-part harmony – written in Old Orthography Russian Characters (PDF)	MIDI	specified "not very slowly"
Dvoretsky	English	PDF – 4-part harmony (PDF), archived from the original (PDF) on 26 April 2012		
Charles Wood (1866–1926)	English	Free scores of Hail, gladdening Light (Charles Wood) in the Choral Public Domain Library (ChoralWiki) Lyrics attributed to Keble, translated from the early Christian hymn Φως ιλαρον.		
John Stainer (1840–1901)	English	Free scores of Hail, gladdening Light (John Stainer) in the Choral Public Domain Library (ChoralWiki) Hymn tune: Sebaste		
Gouzes	French	PDF – 4-part harmony (PDF)		

=== Other ===
- St Gabriel by Rev. Sir F. A. G. Ouseley (1825–1889)
- Christ Church by Rev E. S. Medley (1838–19??)
- Свѣте тихій ("Svyetye tikhiy") from Op. 52, All-Night Vigil, by Pyotr Ilyich Tchaikovsky (1840–1893)
- "Evening Hymn" by Arthur Sullivan (1842–1900)
- Свѣте тихій ("Svyetye tikhiy") Op. 23, No.3 by Alexander Gretchaninov (1864–1956)
- Anthem by Charles Wood (1866–1926)
- Свѣте тихій ("Svyetye tikhiy") from Op. 37, All-Night Vigil, by Sergei Rachmaninoff (1873–1943)
- Anthem by Geoffrey Shaw (1879–1943)
- Op. 28 by Craig Sellar Lang (1891–1972)
- Phos Hilaron by Alexander Flood (1977–)
- Church Music – David Crowder Band, 2009
- "O Gracious Light" by Mason Shefa, 2012.
- Phos Hilaron (Byzantine Theme) for Civilization V: Gods & Kings, by Geoff Knorr, 2012.
