= Ectenia =

Litany prayer in some Christian churches

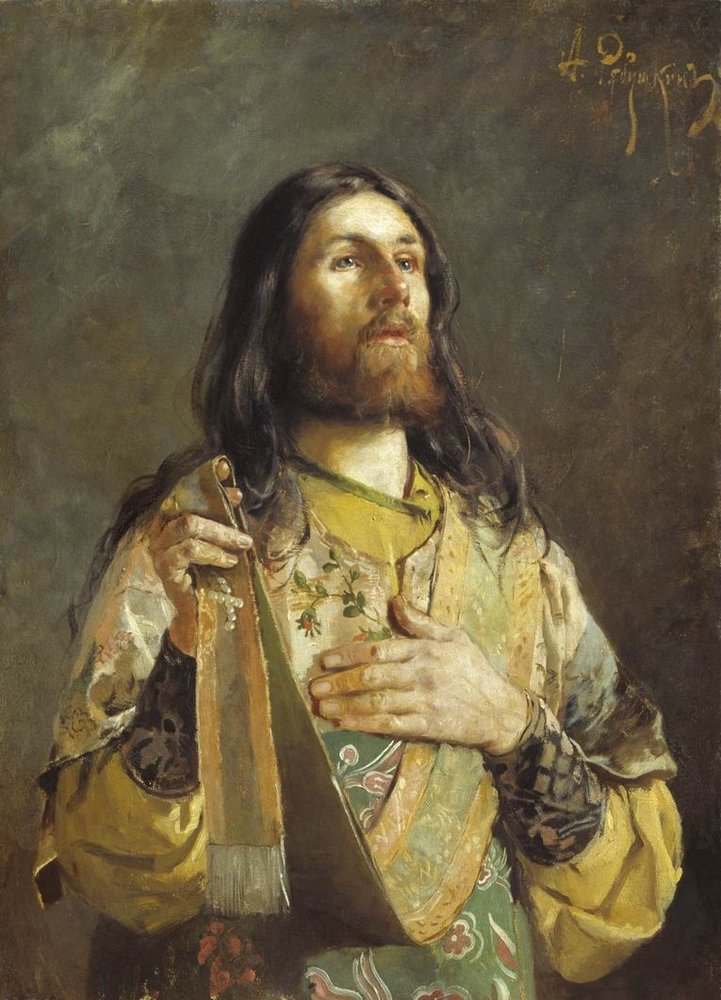
Russian Orthodox deacon intoning an ektenia. Note the stole, or orarion, the end of which is raised by the Deacon after each petition. Painting by Andrei Ryabushkin, 1888

An ektenia (from Greek ἐκτένεια (ekténia), from Greek ἐκτενής (ektenés) 'diligence'), often called by the better known English word litany, consists of a series of petitions occurring in the Eastern Orthodox and Byzantine Catholic liturgies. In Greek, συναπτή, synaptê is the prevalent ecclesiastical word for this kind of litany, while in Church Slavonic, ектенїѧ, yekteniya is the preferred word.

A litany is normally intoned by a deacon, with the choir or people chanting the responses. As he concludes each petition, the deacon raises the end of his orarion and crosses himself; if there is no deacon serving, the petitions are intoned by a priest. (Note: A few litanies are prescribed to be intoned by a priest, such as the ones at the end of compline and the midnight office and those used at the laying-on of hands (ordination) of a priest or bishop.) During many litanies the priest says a prayer silently; (Note: When no deacon is serving, the response to the last petition is typically prolonged to give the priest time to finish the prayer.) after the last petition of the litany, the priest says an ecphonesis which, when a silent prayer is said during the litany, is the final phrase of that prayer.

When there is no priest present during the canonical hours, the litanies are not said; rather, the reader replaces them by saying "Lord, have mercy," three, twelve, or forty times, depending on which litany is being replaced.

== Overview ==
The main forms of the litany are:

- the Great Litany (Greek: Συναπτή μεγάλη/Synaptê Megalê; Slavonic: Ектения великая/Ekteniya Velikaya):
  So called not only because of its length, but because of its importance, coming near the beginning of major services such as the Divine Liturgy, Matins, Vespers, Baptism, Great Blessing of Waters, etc. This ektenia is also called the Litany of Peace (Greek: Εἰρηνικά/Eirênika; Slavonic: Мирнаѧ Ектенїѧ/Mirnaya Ekteniya) because of the opening petition: "In peace, let us pray to the Lord".
- the Litany of Supplication (Greek: Πληρωτικά/Plêrotika Slavonic: Ектения просительная/Ekteniya prositelnaya):
  So called because most of the petitions end with the deacon saying, "...let us ask of the Lord," to which the choir responds, "Grant [it], O Lord". (Greek: Παράσχου, Κύριε/Paraskhou, Kyrie; Slavonic: Подаи, Господи/Podai, Ghospodi. In both languages, the verb does not require an object.)
- the Litany of Fervent Supplication (Greek: Ἐκτενὴς Δέησις/Ektenês Deêsis Slavonic: Ектения сугубая/Ekteniya Sugubaya) also sometimes Impetratory Litany, Augmented Litany, Fervent Litany:
  This litany is remarkable because of the fervor conveyed in the petitions, and heard audibly in the responses, as indicated by the threefold response of the choir, "Lord, have mercy" (thrice). At the divine liturgy, this litany may also be augmented with special petitions, according to need as the pastor sees fit.
- the Little Litany (Greek: Αἴτησις/Aitêsis or Συναπτή Μικρά/Synaptê Mikra; Slavonic: Ектения малая/Ektenia Malaya):
  So called because of its brevity, being only three petitions long. The Little Litany has elements of the other ektenias in it: the fervency of the Litany of Supplication, and the prayer for peace of the Great Litany, being a brief statement of the faith and hope of the church and often serving as a bridge between parts of the services.
- the Litany of the Catechumens (Greek: Δέησις ὑπὲρ τῶν Κατηχουμένων/Deêsis yper tōn Katêkhumenōn Slavonic: Ектения об оглашаемых/Ekteniya ob oglashaemykh):
  At the Divine Liturgy, this litany traditionally ended the part of the service which the catechumens were permitted to attend. This litany is composed of several petitions for the catechumens as they prepare for baptism, and concludes with a dismissal of the catechumens, and (in older times) the closing of the doors of the temple to all but baptized members in good standing.
- the Litany of the Faithful (Greek: Δέησις ὑπὲρ τῶν Πιστῶν/Deêsis yper tōn Pistōn Slavonic: Ектения о выходе оглашенных/Ekteniya o vykhode oglashennykh):
  At the divine liturgy there are a pair of these following the dismissing of the catechumens and commencing the Liturgy of the Faithful, as those remaining prepare for the mystery of Holy Communion. These are unique in that the deacon exclaims, "Wisdom!" before the priest says the ecphonesis.

=== Special litanies ===
Some litanies occur only in particular services, usually in the form of special petitions that are added to the Great Litany (such as at baptism, the special Kneeling Vespers at Pentecost), or unique litanies that occur in only one service (such as those at Requiem services or Holy Unction).

The Liturgy of the Presanctified Gifts contains the litanies found in the other forms of the divine liturgy, a few being altered for the context of the presanctified. One unique litany during this service is the Ektenia for Those Preparing for Illumination (i.e., for those catechumens in the final stages of preparation for baptism on Pascha).

There is also a special form of litany called a lity (Greek: Λιτή/Litê; Slavonic: Литїѧ/Litiya) which is intoned at great vespers, consisting of several long petitions, mentioning the names of numerous saints, to which the choir responds with "Lord, have mercy," many times.
