= Megalynarion =

Special hymn used in the Eastern Orthodox Church

The Megalynarion (Greek Μεγαλυνάριον, "magnification", "that which magnifies"; also called Velichaniye in Church Slavonic) is a special hymn used in the Eastern Orthodox Church and those Eastern Catholic Churches that follow the Byzantine Rite. Depending on the local liturgical tradition, this hymn can be one of several.

== Matins ==
In the Slavic tradition, the Megalynarion is a verse chanted at the end of the Polyeleos on higher-ranking feasts in honour of the saint or feast day being celebrated. The verse usually begins with the words: "We magnify, we magnify thee...", and specifically mentions the name of the saint or the feast.

The verse is chanted first by the clergy and then repeated by the chanters. The chanters then sing a number of appropriate verses from the Psalms, chanting the Megalynarion between each one. During this chanting the senior priest and deacon perform a full censing of the church. At the end, the clergy again chant the Megalynarion.

In the Greek tradition the psalm verses are used alone (without the Megalynarion), and are referred to as the Eclogarion.

== Liturgy ==
In Greek practice, the megalynarion is a short hymn for the saint of the day or the feast that is sung after "Among the first..." at the Divine Liturgy. This type of megalynarion is also used during other services, such as the Paraklesis.

In both the Greek and Slavic traditions the term Megalynarion also describes a hymn chanted on Great Feasts in place of the usual Axion Estin following the Epiclesis of the Liturgy. Normally, this Megalynarion consists of the refrain and Irmos of the Ninth Ode of the Canon of the feast which was chanted at Matins. Among the Slavs, this hymn is referred to as the Zadostoinik.

== Pattern ==
The use of Megalynaria in Orthodox worship dates back to the 8th century. St. Cosmas the Melodist (or Hymnographer), who wrote the original megalynarion to the Theotokos (Virgin Mary), "More honorable than the Cherubim..." for the 9th Ode of the Canon of Great and Holy Thursday. All subsequent megalynaria in Greek follow the same metrical pattern. From there, the megalynaria to various saints found their way into the Divine Liturgy, at the same place where the first one was chanted for St. Basil the Great on his feast day, January 1.
