= Nikolai Danilin =

Russian choral conductor

Nikolai Mikhailovich Danilin
- Николай Михайлович Данилин
- Born: 1878; Moscow
- Died: 1945 (aged 66); Moscow
- Burial place: Vagankovo Cemetery
- Education: Moscow Synodal School, Russian Institute of Theatre Arts
- Occupation: Conductor

Nikolai Danilin (1878, Moscow –1945, Moscow) was a Russian choral conductor.

Danilin graduated from the Moscow Synodal School in 1897 and from the Music and Drama School of the Moscow Philharmonic Society from the piano class of A. N. Koreshchenko in 1907. In 1904 he became assistant director of the Synod Choir and from 1910 to 1918 was its principal director. In 1911, while under his direction, the choir toured Italy, Austria, and Germany, where it demonstrated examples of Russian choral art. After the Great October Socialist Revolution, Danilin directed the best choral groups in the country (the State Choir of the USSR and the Leningrad Academic Choir). In 1923 he began teaching at the Moscow Conservatory, becoming a professor in 1930.

During his time at the synod choir, he conducted the 1915 premiere of Rachmaninoff's All Night Vigil (also known as Vespers or the Vesper Mass).
