= Vladimir Morozan =

Russian historian

Vladimir Vasilevich Morozan
- Born: 16 February 1957 (age 69); Kishinev (Chişinău), Russia
- Occupation: Russian historian

Vladimir Vasilevich Morozan (Russian: Владимир Васильевич Морозан; born 16 February 1957) is a distinguished Russian historian, genealogist, and a Doctor of Historical Sciences. He currently holds the position of Professor at the Faculty of History in St. Petersburg State University.

== Biography ==
Vladimir Vasilevich Morozan was born in Kishinev into the family of a police officer. The Morozanov family were small-scale owners in Bessarabia. After completing school, he initially attempted to enroll in the Faculty of Philosophy, but was unsuccessful. A few years later, in 1984, he entered the History Department of Leningrad State University, from which he graduated in 1990. His specialization was in Modern and Contemporary History, under the guidance of his scientific supervisor, Nina Petrovna Evdokimova. During his time at the university, he focused his studies on the history of Russian-German trade relations, with notable teachers such as B.V. Ananych and E.R. Olkhovsky.

After graduating from the university, Morozan initially worked as a deputy head of the youth club association in the Nevsky district. He later took a teaching position at the Department of National History at St. Petersburg State University. He pursued his candidacy at the Department of Political History at Saint Petersburg State University(headed by K. K. Khudoley), and subsequently at the SPbU of the Russian Academy of Sciences (now St. Petersburg Institute of History).

In 1996, Morozan completed his PhD dissertation titled "State Savings Banks in Pre-revolutionary Russia" (Russian: Государственные сберегательные кассы в дореволюционной России) at the Saint Petersburg branch of the Institute of Russian History, Russian Academy of Sciences. In 2001, he completed his doctoral dissertation on the topic of "History of banking in Russia (second half of the 18th - first half of the 19th centuries) (Russian: История банковского дела в России (вторая половина XVIII — первая половина XIX вв.)), at the same university.

Morozan began his teaching career at St. Petersburg State Medical University, where he worked at the Department of National History from 1991 to 1996. He then worked as an editor at the St. Petersburg Independent Humanitarian Academy from 1996 to 1997. From 1997 to 2008, he held positions as a Senior Lecturer, Associate Professor, and later Professor (since 2002) at St. Petersburg State Agrarian University. From 2003 to 2008, he served as the Head of the Department of Russian History at the university.

Between 2008 and 2014, Morozan held a professorship at the Department of the History of Entrepreneurship and Management at the Faculty of History, St. Petersburg State University. Since 2014, he has been a professor at the Department of History of the Peoples of the Commonwealth of Independent States at the Institute of History, St. Petersburg State University. His research interests encompass economic history from the 18th to the 20th centuries, social history, local history, and genealogy. The majority of his works delve into the history of finance and banking, the class system of the Russian Empire, and the history of Russian entrepreneurship. Notable publications he has contributed to include "Credit and Banks in Russia before the beginning of the 20th century: St. Petersburg and Moscow" (2005) and "History of the Bank of Russia. 1860—2010" (2010). Morozan's research is based on extensive archival sources and relies on statistical data.

== Awards ==
• Winner of the Academician I. D. Kovalchenko Prize of the Russian Academy of Sciences (2015) for the monograph "Business life in the South of Russia in the XIX-early XX century".

• In April 2019, he was awarded the Nicolae Milescu Spetaru Medal of the Academy of Sciences of Moldova.

• Winner of the Makariev Prize in the category "History of Orthodox Countries and Peoples" for the book "Bessarabia and its Nobility in the XIX-early XX centuries" (2019, second prize).

== Works ==
=== Monographs ===
Monografii

- Istoriya bankovskogo dela v Rossii (vtoraya polovina XVIII — pervaya polovina XIX vv.). Sankt-Peterburg: Kriga, 2004. — 400 s. ISBN 5-901805-18-6
- Istoriya sberegatel`ny`x kass v imperatorskoj Rossii. SPb.: Solart, 2007. — 252 s. ISBN 978-5-902543-14-5
- Delovaya zhizn` na yuge Rossii v XIX — nachale XX veka. SPb.: Dmitrij Bulanin, 2014. — 616 s. ISBN 978-5-86007-752-2
- Bessarabiya i eyo dvoryanstvo v XIX — nachale XX veka.: v 2 t. SPb.: Dmitrij Bulanin, 2018. — T. 1. 616 s. ISBN 978-5-86007-869-7; T. 2. 592 s. ISBN 978-5-86007-870-3

Its translation into Moldovan — Basarabia si nobilimea ei în secolul al XiX-lea — începutul secolului al XX-lea. in 2 vol. — Chișinău: Cartier, 2023. V. 1. 533 p. ISBN 978-9975-86-658-3; V. 2. 703 p. ISBN 978-9975-86-693-4

- Sankt-Peterburgskaya kontora Gosudarstvennogo banka i eyo klienty` (1894—1917 gg). SPb.: Dmitrij Bulanin, 2021. — 608 s. ISBN 978-5-86007-972-4
- Dvoryanstvo Sankt-Peterburgskoj gubernii v poslednej treti XVIII - nachale XX veka. SPb.: Dmitrij Bulanin, 2025. - 896 s. ISBN 978-5-6049518-5-9
- Peterburg. Istoriya bankov (sovm. s B. V. Anan`ichem, S. G. Belyaevy`m, Z. V. Dmitrievoj, S. K. Lebedevy`m, P. V. Lizunovy`m). SPb.: Tret`e ty`syacheletie, 2001. — 304 s. ISBN 978-5-88325-048-3
- Kredit i banki v Rossii do nachala XX v.: Sankt-Peterburg i Moskva (sovm. s B. V. Anan`ichem, M. I. Aref`evoj, S. G. Belyaevy`m, A. V. Bugrovy`m, M. M. Dady`kinoj, O. V. Dragan, Z. V. Dmitrievoj, S. K. Lebedevy`m, P. V. Lizunovy`m, Yu. A. Petrovy`m, S. A. Salamatinoj). SPb.: Izd-vo SPbGU, 2005. — 667 s. ISBN 978-5-288-03865-5
- Istoriya Banka Rossii. 1860—2010: v 2 t. — M.: ROSSPE`N, 2010. T. 1: Gosudarstvenny`j bank Rossijskoj imperii (sovm. s B. V. Anan`ichem, A. V. Bugrovy`m, O. V. Dragan, A. P. Koreliny`m, S. K. Lebedevy`m, P. V. Lizunovy`m, I. N. Levichevoj, Yu. A. Petrovy`m, L. E. Shepelevy`m). — 623 s. ISBN 978-5-8243-1423-6 (t. 1)
- Finansovaya sistema Kry`ma: fakty`, soby`tiya, lyudi. K 240-letiyu sozdaniya finansovy`x organov Kry`ma (1784—2024). Simferopol`, 2023. — 376 s. (sovmestno s Borshhik N. D. i Proxorovy`m D. A.)

=== Articles ===
• Iz istorii blagotvoritelnosti v Rossii // Russcoe proshloe. SPb., 1996. No. 6. P. 5–15. /From a history of charity in Russia/;

• Perepisca I.I.Betskogo s Opecunschim sovetom S.-Peterburgscogo Vospitatelnogo doma // Russcoe proshloe. SPb.,1996. No. 6. P. 16–21. /I.I.Betskogo's correspondence with Tutorial advice(council) of the St.-Petersburg Educational house/;

• Iz istorii sberegatelnogo dela v Rossii // Russcoe proshloe. SPb., 1996. No. 7. P. 159–169. /From a history of a savings affair in Russia/;

• Iz istorii ruscoi economichescoi emigratzii con. XIX — nach. XX вв. // Novii Chasovoi. SPb., 1996. No. 4. P. 23–34. /From a history of Russian economic emigration кон. 19th - нач. 20th centuries/;

• Sotzialnii sostav vcladchicov gosudarstvennih sberegatelnih cass v poreformennoi Possii i sfera prilojenia narodnih sberejenii // Dengi i credit. М., 1998. No. 7. P. 73–79. /A social composition of investors of the state savings banks in пореформенной Russia and sphere of the appendix of national savings/;

• Economia e societa in Russia all inizio del secolo. // L altro novecento la Russia nella storia del ventesimo secoloю. Bergamo. 1999. With. 25–37;

• Economichescoe polojenie Russcoi Pravoslavnoi Tzercvi v contze XIX - nachale XX vv.// Nestor. SPb. - Chishinev. 2000. No. 1. P. 311–300. /An economic situation of Russian Orthodox Church at the end of 19th - the beginning of 20th centuries/;

• Operatzionnaia deiatelnosti gosudarstvennih sberegatelnih cass i sotzialnii sostav vcladchicov v 1895—1916 gg. // Dengi i credit. М., 2001. No. 9. P. 64–69. /Operational activity of the state savings banks and a social composition of investors in 1895-1916/;

• Uchrejdenie v Rossii sberegatelnih cass // Istoria glazami istoricov. SPb., 2002. P. 66–90. /Establishment in Russia of savings banks;

• Iz istorii arhivnogo dela v Rossii // Peterburgscaia istorichescaia shcola. Almanah. SPb., 2004. P. 370–385. /From a history of an archival affair in Russia/;

• Zaconodatelnoe regulirovanie torgovoi nesostoiatelnosti v Rossii v pervoi polovine XIX v. // Institut pravovedenia i predprinimatelstva - 10 let. Iubileinii sb. trudov. SPb., 2004. P. 13–19. /Legislative regulation of a trading inconsistency in Russia in first half 19th century/;

• Formirovanie i deiatelnosti administrativnih organov upravlenie v Bessarabscoi oblasti v nachale XIX v. Chasti 1 // SPb.: Clio. Jurnal dlia uchenih, 2005. No. 1. (28). P. 125–134; Chasti 2. SPb.: Clio. Jurnal dlia uchenih, 2005. No. 2. (29). P. 152–161. /Formation and activity of administrative controls in Bessarabia in the beginning of 19th century/;

• Rinoc jeleza b metaloizdelii i ego crupneishie operatori v Priazovscom crae v XIX v. // Industrialnoe nasledie. Materiali III nauchnoi conferentzii. Saransc, 2007. P. 456–467. /The market of iron and hardware and his(its) largest operators in edge(territory) Priazovskom in 19th century/;

• Marc Valjano i hlebnii rinoc v Priazovscom crae vo vtoroi polovine XIX v. // Chelovec v economiche: istoricheschii discurs. Materiali Vserossiiscoi nauchnoi conferentzii, posvechennoi 80-letiiu professora N. L. Klein. Samara, 2007. P. 55–64. /Mark Valjano and the grain market in edge(territory) Priazovskom in the second half of the 19th century/; • Deiatelnosti Azovsco-Donscogo comerchescogo banca na Iuge Rossii v contze XIX v.
