= Axion Estin =

Marian hymn

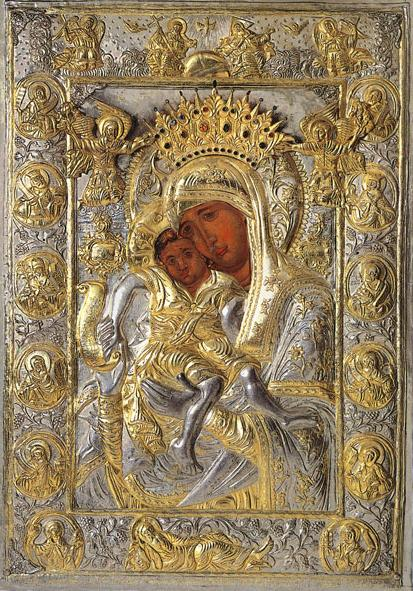
The original icon of Axion Esti, in Protaton Church, in Mount Athos.

Axion estin (Greek: Ἄξιόν ἐστιν, Church Slavonic: Достóйно éсть, romanized: Dostóino yesť), or "It is Truly Meet," is a pair of hymns to the Virgin Mary used in the Divine Liturgies of the Eastern Orthodox and Byzantine Catholic churches, consisting of a magnification and a theotokion.

Axion estin is also a type of Eleousa icon of the Theotokos, after the icon in front of which, according to tradition, the hymn was revealed in the late 10th century; an elder and his disciple lived in a cell on Mount Athos. The icon is currently kept in the Protaton in Karyes.

== See also ==
- Hymns to Mary
