= Vespers =

Sunset evening prayer liturgy

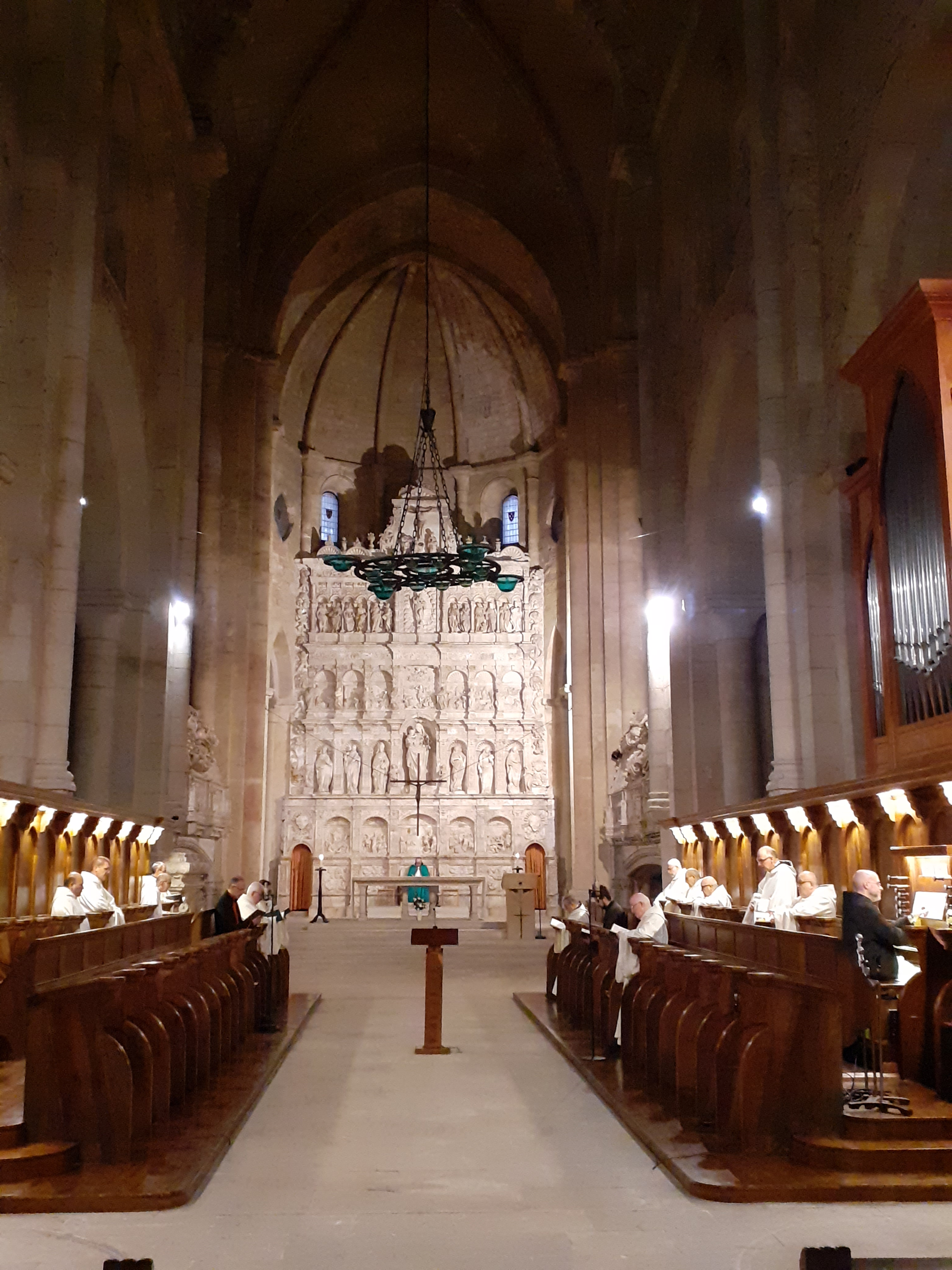
Cistercians singing vespers in Santa Maria de Poblet in Catalonia

Vespers (from Latin vesper 'evening') is a liturgy of evening prayer, one of the canonical hours in Catholic, Orthodoxy (Eastern Orthodox and Oriental Orthodox), Anglican, and Lutheran liturgies.

Vespers typically follows a set order that focuses on the performance of psalms and other biblical canticles. Eastern Orthodox liturgies recognised as vespers (εσπερινός, esperinós) often conclude with Compline, especially the all-night vigil. Performing these liturgies together without break was also a common practice in medieval Europe, especially outside of monastic and religious communities.

Old English speakers translated the Latin word vesperas as æfensang, which became evensong in modern English. The term is now usually applied to the Anglican variant of the liturgy that combines vespers with Compline, following early sixteenth-century worshippers who conceived these as a single unit. The term can also apply to the pre-Reformation form of vespers or forms of evening prayer from other denominations.

Vespers is usually prayed around sunset. In Oriental Orthodox Christianity, the office is known as Ramsho in the Indian and Syriac traditions; it is prayed facing the east by all members in these churches, both clergy and laity, being one of the seven fixed prayer times.

== Current use ==
=== Roman Rite ===
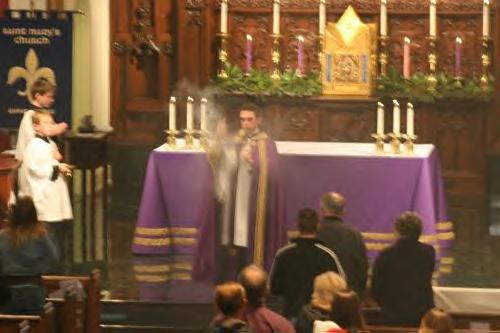
Incensing the congregation during the Magnificat at an Advent celebration of Vespers

Vespers, also called Evening Prayer, takes place as dusk begins to fall. Evening Prayer gives thanks for the day just past and makes an evening sacrifice of praise to God (Psalm 141:1).

The general structure of the Roman Rite Catholic liturgy of vespers is as follows:

- Vespers begins with the singing or chanting of the opening responsory consisting of the verse Deus, in adiutorium meum intende, followed by the Gloria Patri, and the Alleluia. The Alleluia is omitted during Lent. This opening formula is common to all the liturgical hours apart from the first of the day where it is replaced by the Invitatory.
- The appointed hymn (from the hymnaria) is then sung;
- The appointed psalmody is then sung: in the liturgy in general use since 1970 there are two psalms and a New Testament canticle. In older forms of the Roman Office five psalms were sung. Each psalm (and canticle) concludes with a doxology (Gloria Patri) and is preceded and followed by an antiphon. Additionally, most Psalms also have a short caption explaining how the Psalm/Canticle relates to the Church in a Christological or spiritual way; lastly, English translations oftentimes have a psalm-prayer said after the Gloria and before the antiphon.
- After the psalms, there is a reading from the Bible.
- Following the reading, there is a short responsory consisting of a verse, a response, the first half only of the Gloria Patri, and then the verse again.
- The Magnificat follows – the canticle of the Blessed Virgin Mary from the Luke 1:46–55 – the key daily canticle of Vespers. Like the psalmody, the Magnificat is always preceded by an antiphon, and followed by the Gloria and the repeated antiphon. While singing the Magnificat the altar may be incensed, followed by the ministers and the people.
- The preces (intercessory prayers) are then said, followed by the Lord's Prayer, and then the collect (oratio) and blessing.
- The office is sometimes followed by Benediction of the Blessed Sacrament.

==== First and Second Vespers ====
Sundays and solemnities have two Vespers. The church worship day begins in the evening with the setting of the sun or at sunset. This practice follows the tradition of the Old Testament which says in the story of creation: "Evening came, and morning followed – the first day." (Gen1:5). The solemnity begins with First Vespers prayed around sunset on the day before the observance, with Second Vespers held around sunset on the day itself.

=== Byzantine Rite ===
The Byzantine Rite has three basic types of vespers: great, daily, and small. Great Vespers takes place on Sundays and major feast days (those when the Polyeleos is prescribed at matins) when it may be celebrated alone or as part of an All-Night Vigil, as well as on a handful of special days e.g., Good Friday and Pascha afternoon; on certain days of strict fasting when, in theory, fasting before communion should be day-long, vespers also commences the divine liturgy and always commences the Liturgy of the Presanctified Gifts. Daily vespers is otherwise used. Small vespers, which is seldom used except in monasteries, is a very abbreviated form used only on the afternoon before a vigil and is redundant to the subsequent great vespers, being a placeholder between the None and Compline.

Since the liturgical day begins at sunset, vespers is a day's first liturgy and its hymns introduce the day's themes.

==== Outline ====
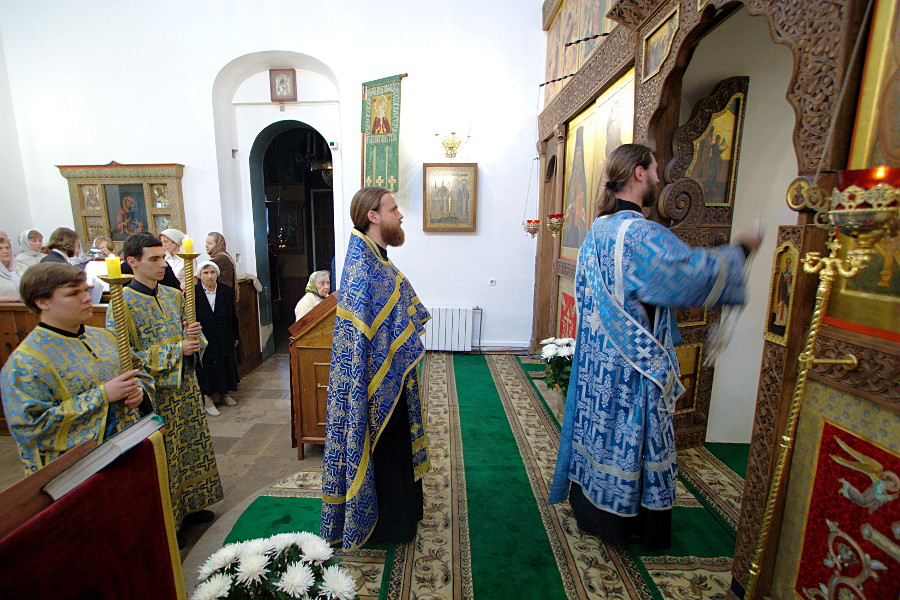
Orthodox priest and deacon making the Entrance with the censer at Great Vespers

The general structure of the liturgy is as follows (psalm numbers are according to the Septuagint):

- Vespers opens with a blessing by the priest and then "Come, let us worship ..."; when part of an All-Night Vigil, the blessing that normally begins matins is used; when part of the Divine Liturgy, the blessing that is part thereof is used.
- Proemial Psalm (Psalm 103 (104)): "Bless the Lord, O my soul; O Lord my God, Thou hast been magnified exceedingly...".
- The "Litany of Peace".
- A kathisma, a portion of the Psalter is read, or on Saturday evening, when it is the First Kathisma (Psalms 1–8), it is sung, and on major feast, the first third of that (Psalms 1–3) is sung. For about half the year, and for five of the six weeks of Lent, on weekdays, it is the Eighteenth Kathisma (Psalms 119-133 [120-134]).
- The church is censed while "Lord I have Cried" (Psalms 140 (141), 141 (142), 129 (130), and 116 (117)) is sung with stichera (stanzas) about the feast day (or resurrection on a Saturday) inserted between the last several verses.
- The Entrance is made with the censer unless there is a Gospel reading, in which case the Gospel Book is carried.
- The hymn Phos Ilaron ("O Gladsome Light") is recited or sung.
- The Prokeimenon is chanted.
- On feast days, there are three or more readings from the Old Testament, called Prophecies.
- The Litany of Fervent Supplication
- The prayer "Vouchsafe, O Lord", is read.
- The Litany of Supplication
- On major feast days, a Litiy is inserted. The clergy and the cantors process to the narthex or outside while hymns pertaining to the feastare sung. Then the deacon recites a litany with several long petitions, the response to each petition beings Kyrie eleison ("Lord, Have Mercy") many times. The priest ends with a long prayer invoking the intercessions of the saints and the Theotokos.
- The Aposticha are chanted. These are verses that teach about the feast day (or on a Saturday evening, Christ's resurrection).
- The Nunc dimittis, the Canticle of St. Simeon ("Lord, now lettest Thou Thy servant depart in peace...") (Luke 2:29–32), is read.
- Then are sung the Apolytikia of the day (or an All-Night Vigil on Saturday night the hymn "Rejoice, O Virgin Theotokos").

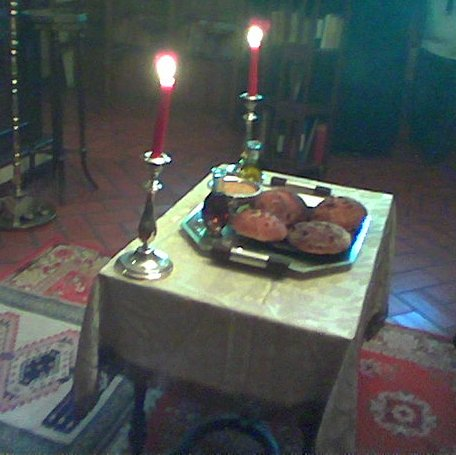
Table set with five loaves, wheat, wine and oil for artoklassia

- On major feast days, the artoklasia is performed, at which the priest blesses five loaves of bread which have been prepared in the center of the church, together with wheat, wine and oil which are later distributed to the faithful. The beginning of Psalm 33 (34) is then sung.
- The dismissal is given by the priest. If it is an All-Night Vigil this is a simple blessing by the priest; otherwise, it is the full dismissal sequence.

On strict fast days when food and drink are prohibited before vespers, e.g., Christmas Eve, the Annunciation when it falls on a weekday of great lent, or Holy Saturday, Vespers is joined to the Divine Liturgy, functioning in place of the typica as the framework of the hymns of the Liturgy of the Catechumens. After the readings from the Old Testament, the Trisagion is chanted, followed by the Epistle and Gospel, and the Divine Liturgy proceeds normally from that point. On these occasions, as at other times when the Gospel is read at vespers, the Little Entrance is made with the Gospel Book instead of the censer.

The Liturgy of the Presanctified Gifts always is similarly combined with Vespers, with the first half of Vespers (up to and including the Old Testament readings) making up a significant portion of the liturgy.

=== East Syriac liturgy ===
Vespers are known by the Aramaic or Syriac term Ramsha in the East Syriac liturgy which was used historically in the Church of the East and remains in use in Churches descended from it, namely the Assyrian Church of the East, the Ancient Church of the East, the Chaldean Catholic Church, and the Syro-Malabar Catholic Church.

=== Oriental Orthodoxy ===
==== Armenian liturgy ====
The office of vespers Old Armenian: Երեգոյին Ժամ, romanized: Eregoyin Zham commemorates the hour when "the Son of God descended from the Cross, and was wrapped in the winding sheet, and laid in the tomb."

Vespers is the only liturgy in the Armenian daily office other than the Morning Service which has hymns proper to the commemoration, feast, or tone assigned to it: a vespers hymn after Psalm 142 (or after Gladsome Light if it is appointed for the day) and the "Lifting-up Hymn" after Psalm 121.

Vespers undergoes a wide range of changes depending on the liturgical season. The following outline contains only some of these variations.

Outline of Armenian Vespers

"Blessed is our Lord Jesus Christ. Amen. Our Father..."

Psalm 55:16 "I cried unto God, and he heard me in the evening...(Es ar Astouats kardats`i...)"; Psalm 55:17 "I waited for my God...(Spasēy Astoutsoy imoy...)"; "Glory to the Father...Now and always...Amen."; "And again in peace..."; "Blessing and glory to the Father...Now and always...Amen."; "Peace to all."

Psalm 86; "Glory to the Father...Now and always...Amen."; "Glory to you, O God, glory to you. For all things, Lord, glory to you."; "And again in peace..."; "Blessing and glory...Now and always...Amen."; "Peace to all."

Psalm 140 "Rescue me...(Aprets`o zis...)"; Psalm 141 "Lord I called unto you...(Tēr kardats`i ar k`ez...)"; Psalm 142 "With my voice I called out unto the Lord...(Dzayniw imov ar Tēr kardats`i...)"; "Glory to the Father...Now and always...Amen."

At Sunday Vespers (Saturday Evening): "Alleluia, Alleluia. Gladsome light...(Loys zouart`...)"; Exhortation for the blessing of candles: "Blessed Lord who dwells in the heights...(Awrhneal Tēr...)"; Proclamation: "Having assembled...(Hasealk`s...)"; Exhortation: "Having assembled...(Hasealk`s...)"

Vespers Hymn (varies)

At Sunday Vespers (Saturday Night): Proclamation: "Let us all say...(Asasts`owk`...)"; Exhortation: "We have the intercessions...(Barekhaws ounimk`...)"

During Fasts: Proclamation: "Let us beseech almighty God...(Aghach`ests`ouk` zamenakaln Astouats...)"

Otherwise continue here:

Prayer: "Hear our voices...(Lour dzaynits` merots`...)"; "Holy God...(varies)"; "Glorified and praised ever-virgin...(P`araworeal ev awrhneal misht Astouatsatsin...)"; Exhortation: "Save us...(P`rkea zmez...)"; Proclamation: "And again in peace...That the Lord will hearken to the voice of our entreaty...(Vasn lsel linelov...)"; "Blessing and Glory to the Father...Now and always...Amen."; "Peace to all."

Psalm 121 "I lifted my eyes...(Hambardzi zach`s im...)"; "Glory to the Father...Now and always...Amen."

Hymn After Psalm 121 (varies); Proclamation: "For the peace of the whole world...(Vasn khaghaghout`ean amenayn ashkharhi...)"; Prayer: "Father compassionate...(Hayr gt`ats...)"

On fasting days:

Exhortation: "Almighty Lord...(Tēr amenakal...)"; Proclamation; Prayer

On fasting days and lenten days which are not Sundays (Saturday evenings), continue here:

The Prayer of Manasseh; "Glory to the Father...Now and always...Amen."; Exhortation; Proclamation; Prayer; "Remember your ministers...(Yishea Tēr zpashtawneays k`o...)"; "Merciful and compassionate God (Barerar ev bazoumoghorm Astouats...)"

On Sundays (Saturday Evenings) and during the 50 days of Easter:

Psalm 134: "Now bless the Lord, all you servants of the Lord...(Ast awrhnets`ēk`...)"; Psalm 138; Psalm 54; Psalm 86:16-17; "Glory to the Father...Now and always...Amen."; Proclamation: "Let us entreat...(Khndrests`ouk`...)"

On Sundays: Prayer: "King of peace...(T`agawor khaghaghout`ean...)"

On Sundays during Eastertide: Prayer: "By your all-powerful and joyous resurrection...(K`oum amenazawr ev hrashali...)"

On Feasts of the Cross: Proclamation: "By the holy cross...(Sourb khach`iws...)"; Prayer: "Defend us...(Pahpanea zmez...)"

All liturgies conclude with: "Blessed is our Lord Jesus Christ. Amen. Our Father..."

==== Coptic Orthodox Church ====
In the Coptic Orthodox Church, Vespers refers to a series of liturgies:

1. The Vespers Prayer – This is taken from the Canonical Book of Hours. In the liturgical context, the 9th, 11th, 12th and Veil hours are prayed.
2. The Vespers Praises – This is taken from the Psalmody and is described in greater detail below.
3. The Vespers Raising of Incense

Vespers, as a whole, is an introduction and preparation for the Eucharistic Liturgy, consisting of a collection of prayers, praises and Thanksgiving prayers which request the Lord's blessings upon the sacramental liturgy.

The rite of Vespers Praises in the Coptic Orthodox Church is as follows:

1. The hymn Ⲛⲓⲉⲑⲛⲟⲥ ⲧⲏⲣⲟⲩ (Psalm 116)
2. The Fourth Canticle (Psalms 148, 149, 150)
3. The Psali for the day (each day of the week has its own Psali)
4. The Theotokion for the day (each day of the week has its own Theotokion)
5. The Lobsh or Explanation of the Theotokion
6. The reading of the Antiphonary
7. On Sunday, Monday and Tuesday: The Conclusion of the Adam Theotokia
8. On Wednesday, Friday, Saturday, Sunday: The Conclusion of the Batos Theotokia
9. Ⲥⲱⲑⲓⲥ ⲁⲙⲏⲛ (Saved Amen.)
10. The Lord's Prayer

The rite of Vespers Raising of Incense in the Coptic Orthodox Church is as follows:

1. The Thanksgiving Prayer – As with all Coptic Orthodox liturgies, Vespers first thanks God "for everything, concerning everything, and in everything"
2. Minor Circuit of Incense and Three Inaudible Litanies
3. The Verses of the Cymbals
4. The Litany for the Departed
5. Major Circuit of Incense
6. Graciously Accord O Lord...
7. The Trisagion
8. The Doxologies – commemorating the saints of the church and the liturgical season of the church
9. The Creed
10. The Prayer of Ⲫⲛⲟⲩϯ ⲛⲁⲓ ⲛⲁⲛ (O God have mercy upon us...)
11. The Prayer for the Gospel
12. The Reading of the Psalm and Gospel
13. The Absolution, Conclusion, and Blessing

==== Indian Orthodox Church and Syriac Orthodox Church ====
In the Indian Orthodox Church, Vespers (Ramsho) is one of the canonical hours given in the Shehimo.

=== Lutheran Church ===
Vespers at Vadstena Abbey Church (Evangelical-Lutheran) in Sweden

Following the Reformation, the form of Vespers in the Evangelical-Lutheran Churches remained largely unchanged. First Vespers and Second Vespers of Sundays and major feasts continued to be sung in Latin in many places, while some cathedrals and larger city churches continued singing Vespers in Latin on a daily basis into the eighteenth century. In the present-day, vespers is sung in the vernacular tongue of an area, though the use of Latin persists in some Evangelical-Lutheran churches.

=== In other Christian churches and religious bodies ===
Since its inception, the Anglican communion has maintained an evening office, which is called evening prayer (or evensong). There are prescribed forms of the service in the Anglican prayer book. The Anglican Breviary contains Vespers in English according to the pre-1970 Roman Rite. For information on that service, see above, as in the Roman breviary. The Liberal Catholic Rite also includes Vespers, including the Te Deum as an alternative to the Magnificat.

Daily office books that conform to the historic structure of Vespers have also been published by the Pilgrim Press (The New Century Psalter) and Westminster John Knox Press (Book of Common Worship Daily Prayer). Both publishing houses are affiliated with churches in the Reformed tradition.

From its traditional usage, the term vespers has come to be used more broadly for various evening services of other churches, some of which model their evening services on the traditional Latin Catholic form. Presbyterians and Methodists, as well as congregationalist religious bodies such as Unitarian Universalism, often include congregational singing, readings, and a period of silent meditation, contemplation, or prayer.

In addition, during the 19th and early 20th centuries, synagogues in the Classical Reform tradition sometimes referred to their Friday evening worship services as "vespers". Nowadays, such services are instead called kabbalat shabbat, which means "welcoming the Sabbath".

== Historical development ==
This section incorporates information from the Catholic Encyclopedia of 1917. References to psalms follow the numbering system of the Septuagint, and said in the Latin of the Vulgate.

=== Origins ===
From the time of the early Church, the practice of seven fixed prayer times have been taught; in Apostolic Tradition, Hippolytus instructed Christians to pray seven times a day "on rising, at the lighting of the evening lamp, at bedtime, at midnight" and "the third, sixth and ninth hours of the day, being hours associated with Christ's Passion."

Before the fourth century allusions to the evening prayer are found in the earlier Fathers, Clement I of Rome (Clemens Romanus), St. Ignatius, Clement of Alexandria, Tertullian, Origen, the Canons of St. Hippolytus, St. Cyprian. Vespers is, therefore, together with Vigil, the most ancient Office known in the Church.

The Rule of St. Benedict was written about 530–43. A much earlier evening Office corresponds to both Vespers and Compline. Its name varies. John Cassian calls it Vespertina synaxis, or Vespertina solemnitas. Benedict used the name vespera which has prevailed, whence the French word vêpres and the English vespers. The name, however, by which it was most widely known during that period was Lucernalis or Lucernaria hora. It was so called because at this hour candles were lit, not only to give light, but also for symbolical purposes. The eregrinatio, the date of which is probably the 4th century, gives the liturgical order as practised at Jerusalem. The author states that this Office took place at the tenth hour (four o'clock in the evening); it is really the Office des lumières, i.e. of the lights; it was celebrated in the Church of the Holy Sepulchre; all the lamps and torches of the church were lighted, making, as the author says, "an infinite light". In the "Antiphonary of Bangor", an Irish document of the 6th century, Vespers are called hora duodecima, which corresponds to six o'clock in the evening, or hora incensi, or again ad cereum benedicendum.

Vespers, then, was the most solemn office of the day and was composed of the psalms called Lucernales (Psalm 140 is called psalmus lucernalis by the Apostolic Constitutions). Cassian describes this Office as it was celebrated by the monks of Egypt and says they recited twelve psalms as at the vigil (matins). Then two lessons were read as at vigils, one from the Old, and the other from the New Testament. Each psalm was followed by a short prayer. Cassian says the Office was recited towards five or six o'clock and that all the lights were lit. The use of incense, candles, and other lights would seem to suggest the Jewish rites which accompanied the evening sacrifice (Exodus 29:39; Numbers 28:4; Psalm 140:2; Daniel 9:21; 1 Chronicles 23:30). It may thus be seen that the Lucernarium was, together with Vigil, the most important part of the offices of the day, being composed of almost the same elements as the latter, at least in certain regions. Its existence in the fourth century is also confirmed by St. Augustine, St. Ambrose, St. Basil, St. Ephraem, and, a little later, by several councils in Gaul and Spain, and by the various monastic rules.

=== In the 6th century ===
In the sixth century the office of Vespers in the Latin Church was almost the same as it has been throughout the Middle Ages and up to the present day. In a document of unquestionable authority of that period the canonical hours are described as follows: The evening hour, or vespertina synaxis, is composed of four psalms, a capitulum, a response, a hymn, a versicle, a canticle from the Gospel, litany (Kyrie eleison, Christe eleison), Pater with the ordinary finale, oratio, or prayer, and dismissal (Regula Sancti Benedicti, xvii). The psalms recited are taken from the series of psalms from Pss. 109 to 147 (with the exception of the groups 117 to 127 and 133 to 142); Pss. 138, 143, 144 are each divided into two portions, whilst the Pss. 115 and 116 are united to form one. This disposition is almost the same as that of the Ordo Romanus, except that the number of psalms recited is five instead of four. They are taken, however, from the series 109 to 147. Here, too, the capitulum, versicle, and canticle of the Magnificat appear. The hymn is a more recent introduction in the Roman Vespers; the finale (litanies, Pater, versicles, prayers) seems all to have existed from this epoch as in the Benedictine cursus. Like the other hours, therefore, Vespers is divided into two parts; the psalmody, or singing of the psalms, forming the first part, and the capitulum and formulæ the second. Vesper time varied according to the season between the tenth hour (4 p.m.) and the twelfth (6 p.m.). As a matter of fact it was no longer the evening hour, but the sunset hour, so that it was celebrated before the day had departed and consequently before there was any necessity for artificial light (Regula S. Benedicti, xli). This was an innovation; before this epoch this evening synaxis was celebrated with all the torches alight. The reason of this is that St Benedict introduced in the cursus, another hour – that of Compline – which was prescribed to be celebrated in the evening, and which might be considered as a kind of doubling of the Office of Lucernarium.

=== Office of Vespers in the Middle Ages: variations ===
As has already been remarked, the institution of the office of Compline transformed the lucernarium by taking from it something of its importance and symbolism, the latter at the same time losing its original sense. St. Benedict called it only Vespera, the name which has prevailed over that of lucernarium (cf. Ducange, Glossarium med. et inf. lat., s.v. Vesperae). The Gallican liturgy, the Mozarabic Liturgy or Hispanic rite, and, to a certain extent, the Milanese, have preserved the lucernarium (cf. Bäumer-Biron, l. c., 358), though in the Hispanic rite the term lucernarium" is used not to refer to vespers, but as the name for the first chant of this service and only within late manuscripts associated with Toledo ("Tradition B" manuscripts), whereas all other manuscripts of this rite ("Tradition A" manuscripts) use the name vespertinus for this chant genre. Eastern Orthodox Church retains the Lumen hilare and some other traces of the ancient lucernarium in the offices of Vespers and Compline (cf. Smith, "Dict. Christ. Antiq.", s.v. Office, Divine). In the Rule of St. Columbanus, dated about 590, Vespers still has twelve psalms, amongst which are Pss. cxii and cxiii, the Gradual psalms, Pss. cxix sqq. (cf. Gougaud, Les chrétientés celtiques, 309; Dict. d'arch. chrét. et de liturgie, s.v. Celtique, 3015). The "Antiphonary of Bangor", a document of Irish origin, gives for vespers Ps. cxii and also the Gloria in Excelsis. For modifications since the 12th century, cf. Bäumer-Biron, l. c., II, 54 sqq.

=== Changes as of 1917 ===
The decree Divino afflatu of 1911 involves important changes in the old Roman Rite office. There is an entire rearrangement of the psalms (see Reform of the Roman Breviary by Pope Pius X) with new ones appointed for each day of the week. These psalms are to be recited with their antiphons, not only at the officia de tempore (Sundays and feriæ) but also on feasts of a lesser rite than doubles of the second class, that is to say, on simples, semidoubles (double minors), and double majors. On feasts which are doubles of the second class and a fortiori of the first class, as well as on feasts of the Blessed Virgin Mary, the Holy Angels, and Apostles, the psalms are proper to the feast as heretofore. On all feasts, of whatever rite, the second part of vespers, that is, the capitulum, hymn, antiphon of the Magnificat, is taken from the Sanctorale. On semi-doubles and those of a lesser rite the suffrages are now reduced to a single antiphon and orison which is common to all the saints heretofore commemorated, whilst the preces (Miserere and versicles) formerly imposed on the greater feriæ are now suppressed.

=== Structure: 1917–1969 ===
The office of Vespers in general use before 1970 continues to be used today by those adhering to the Roman Rite as in 1962 or to earlier versions. The structure of Vespers prior to 1970 is as follows:

- Vespers begins with the singing or chanting of the opening versicles Deus, in adiutorium ("O God, come to my assistance".) From Septuagesima until Easter, Laus tibi Domine, Rex aeternae gloriae ("Praise be to Thee O Lord, King of eternal glory") replaces the Alleluia.
- Five psalms are sung, each concluding with the doxology Gloria Patri. Each psalm is preceded and followed with an antiphon
- The Little Chapter, a short biblical verse, is read
- The hymn, which varies according to season and feast, is sung, followed by its versicle and response
- The Magnificat, preceded and followed with an antiphon, is then sung
- The preces are then said on certain greater ferias
- The collect of the day is said, followed by commemorations of any concurring feasts according to the rubrics
- If Compline does not immediately follow, Vespers may end with the seasonal Marian Antiphon
- The office is frequently followed by Benediction of the Blessed Sacrament

=== Symbolism: the hymns ===
Notwithstanding the changes brought about in the course of time, Vespers still remains the great and important office of the evening. As already pointed out, it recalls the sacrificium vespertinum of the Old Law. In the same manner as the night is consecrated to God by the Office of the Vigil, so also is the end of the day by Vespers. It terminates, as Matins formerly terminated, and Lauds at present terminates, by a lection, or reading, from the Gospel, or canticum evangelii, which, for Vespers, is always the Magnificat. This is one of the characteristic traits of Vespers, one of the liturgical elements which this particular Office has retained in almost all regions and at all times. There are, however, a few exceptions, as in some liturgies the Magnificat is sung at Lauds (cf. Cabrol in Dict. d'arch. et de liturgie, s.v. Cantiques évangéliques). This place of honour accorded so persistently to the canticle of Mary from such remote antiquity is but one of the many, and of the least striking, proofs of the devotion which has always been paid to the Blessed Virgin Mary in the Church. The psalms used at Vespers have been selected, from time immemorial, from Pss. cix to cxlvii, with the exception of Ps. cxviii, which on account of its unusual length does not square with the others, and is consequently ordinarily divided up into parts and recited at the little hours. Pss. i to cviii are consecrated to Matins and Lauds, whilst the three last psalms, cxlviii to cl, belong invariably to Lauds.

The series of hymns consecrated to Vespers in the Roman Breviary also form a class apart and help to give us some hints as to the symbolism of this hour. The hymns are very ancient, dating probably, for the most part, from the 6th century. They have this particular characteristic – they are all devoted to the praise of one of the days of the Creation as described in the Genesis creation narrative, according to the day of the week, thus:

1. the first, Lucis creator optime, on Sunday, to the creation of light;
2. the second, Immense coeli Conditor on Monday, to the separation of the earth and the waters;
3. the third, Telluris alme Conditor, on Tuesday, to the creation of the plants;
4. the fourth, Caeli Deus sanctissime,, on Wednesday, to the creation of the sun and moon;
5. the fifth, Magnae Deus potentiae, on Thursday, to the creation of the fish;
6. the sixth, Hominis supernae Conditor,, on Friday, to the creation of the beasts of the earth;
7. Saturday is an exception, the hymn, Iam sol recedit igneus,, on that day being in honour of the Blessed Trinity, because of the Office of Sunday then commencing.

=== Solemn Vespers before the Second Vatican Council ===
On weekdays that are not major feasts Vespers features hardly any ceremonies and the celebrant wears the usual choir dress. However, on Sundays and greater feasts Vespers may be solemn. Solemn Vespers differ in that the celebrant wears the cope, he is assisted by assistants also in copes, incense is used, and two acolytes, a thurifer, and at least one master of ceremonies are needed. On ordinary Sundays only two assistants are needed while on greater feasts four or six assistants may be used. The celebrant and assistants vest in the surplice and the cope, which is of the color of the day. The celebrant sits at the sedile, in front of which is placed a lectern, covered with a cloth in the color of the day. The assistants sit on benches or stools facing the altar, or if there are two assistants, they may sit at the sedile next to the celebrant (the first assistant in the place of the deacon and the second assistant in place of the subdeacon).

The celebrant and assistants follow the acolytes into the church wearing the biretta. Upon arriving in the sanctuary the acolytes place their candles on the lowest altar step, after which they are extinguished. The celebrant and assistants kneel on the lowest step and recite the Aperi Domine silently, after which they go to their places and recite the Pater noster and Ave Maria silently. A curious practice which exists from ancient times is the intoning of the antiphons and psalms to the celebrant. The rubrics presuppose that the first assistant or cantors will intone all which the celebrant must sing by singing it to him first in a soft voice after which the celebrant sings it again aloud. The five antiphons and psalms are sung with the first assistant intoning the antiphons and the cantors intoning the psalms. During the singing of the psalms all sit. After the psalms, the acolytes relight their candles and carry them to each side of the lectern for the chapter. The assistants follow, standing facing each other in front of the lectern. The celebrant then sings the chapter, after which all return to their places. The first assistant intones the hymn to the celebrant, and all stand while the hymn is sung. The first assistant intones the Magnificat to the celebrant, who sings the first line aloud. The celebrant and the first two assistants go to altar, and the altar is then incensed as at Mass while the first two assistants hold the ends of the cope. Other altars in the church may be incensed as well. The first assistant then incenses the celebrant, after which the thurifer incenses the others as at Mass. If there are commemorations, the acolytes and assistants again go to the lectern as described above for the chapter. The choir sings the antiphons, the cantors sing the versicles, and the celebrant sings the collects. After all commemorations, the celebrant sings Dominus vobiscum, the cantor sings Benedicamus Domino, and the celebrant sings Fidelium animae.... The Marian antiphon is said in the low voice. Especially in English-speaking countries, Benediction of the Blessed Sacrament often follows Solemn Vespers.

== Musical settings ==
The psalms and hymns of the Vespers liturgy have attracted the interest of many composers, including Claudio Monteverdi, Antonio Vivaldi, Wolfgang Amadeus Mozart, and Anton Bruckner. (Sergei Rachmaninoff's "Vespers" is really a setting of the Eastern Orthodox all-night vigil; calling it "Vespers" was an error in judgement made by a translator.)

== See also ==
- Vespers of Corpus Christi
- Vespers of 1610
- Hymnwriter
- Agni Parthene
- Blazhen Muzh
- Ramsha
- Sacred music
