= Polyeleos =

Festive portion of the Matins service

The Polyeleos is a festive portion of the Matins or All-Night Vigil service as observed on higher-ranking feast days in the Eastern Orthodox, Eastern Lutheran, and Byzantine Rite Catholic Churches. The Polyeleos is considered to be the high point of the service, and contains the reading of the Matins Gospel. Because of its liturgical importance, settings for the Polyeleos have been composed by Sergei Rachmaninoff and others.

The name derives from Greek Πολυέλεος (pl. Πολυέλεοι), meaning "of much mercy", because of the repetition in one of the Polyeleoi of the phrase "ὅτι εἰς τὸν αἰῶνα τὸ ἔλεος αὐτοῦ" (hoti eis ton aiōna to eleos autou), meaning "because forever [lasts] His mercy"),

== Psalms ==
Specifically, the Polyeleos consists of Psalms 134 and 135 (Septuagint numbering; King James Version: Psalms 135 and 136), which are solemnly chanted in a festive melody, with refrains Alleluia chanted between each verse. The refrain for Psalm 134 is "Alleluia". The refrain for Psalm 135 is "Alleluia, alleluia. For His mercy endureth forever. Alleluia." This repeated chanting of the word "mercy" is another reason for the chanting of these psalms to be called Polyeleos.

In its fullest musical setting, it can last up to over an hour. Nowadays, the psalms are usually shortened to only a few select verses each, except in certain monasteries.

During the chanting, Holy Doors are opened, and the clergy come out of the sanctuary to stand in front of the icon of the feast, which lies on an analogion in the center of the nave. The deacon (or priest, if there is no deacon) censes the icon of the feast being celebrated. However, if it is a Sunday service, the Holy Doors are opened, the clergy remain in the sanctuary and the priest censes the front of the Holy Table (altar).

On feast days, the Polyeleos is followed by selected verses of other psalms which are relevant to the feast. In the Greek Orthodox tradition, these verses are referred to as the eklogarion; in the Russian Orthodox usage a hymn called the megalynarion (magnification) is chanted between these selected verses, while the clergy perform a full censing of the church.

On Sundays, in place of the eklogarion, a hymn called the Evlogitaria is chanted in honor of the Resurrection, commemorating the journey of the Myrrhbearers on their way to the Tomb of Christ and the announcement of the Resurrection of Jesus. If a feast day with megalynarion falls on a Sunday, only the refrain of the megalynarion is chanted, once, after which the evlogitaria are chanted. (If, however, a Great Feast of the Lord falls on a Sunday, nothing of the ordinary Sunday service is chanted, but everything is chanted for the Great Feast, and the order follows that of weekdays.)

On the three Sundays before the beginning of Great Lent, Psalm 136 (KJV: Psalm 137), "By the waters of Babylon", is added to the Polyeleos. This psalm recounts the sorrow of the Jews during the Babylonian captivity, and their yearning for Jerusalem; and is prescribed by the Church at this time to bring forth in the faithful sorrow over their captivity to sin and yearning for the Heavenly Jerusalem.

In the Greek usage, Psalm 44 (KJV: Psalm 45) replaces Psalms 134 and 135 on feasts of the Theotokos (Mother of God).

== Portion of the service ==
In a wider sense, the term Polyeleos refers to an entire section of the Matins service which falls after the readings from the psalter and before the chanting of the canon. Services below the rank of Polyeleos are missing this section entirely (with the exception of Psalm 50, which is read every day except during Bright Week). The specific outline of the Polyeleos differs depending upon the day of the week:

=== Sundays ===
(On Sundays, the Polyeleos takes place in the sanctuary, with the clergy standing around the Holy Table, which represents the Tomb of Christ. Almost all of the hymns are chanted in the Tone of the Week)

Polyeleos (Psalms 134 and 135)
(Megalynarion, if any)
Evlogitaria of the Resurrection—hymns based on Psalm 118
Little Ektenia (Litany)
Ypakoë—hymn reflecting the obedience of those sent to proclaim the Resurrection
Sessional Hymns—a type of hymn which follows readings from the Psalter
Anavathmoi—hymns based on the Psalms of Degrees
Prokeimenon in the Tone of the Week
"Let every breath praise the Lord" in the same tone as the Prokeimenon
Matins Gospel-one of the 11 lessons recounting the Resurrection Appearances of Jesus
"Having Beheld the Resurrection of Christ"—a Resurrectional hymn
Psalm 50 (KJV: Psalm 51)
Troparia following Psalm 50—paschal hymns in honour of the Resurrection (these differ during Great Lent but are the same for the rest of the year)
The "Great Intercession"—an extended petition, to which the choir respond, Kyrie Eleison 12 times

During certain seasons of the year, if there is no feast day of Polyeleos or higher rank occurring on a Sunday, Psalms 134 and 135 are replaced by Psalm 118 (KJV: Psalm 119).

=== Weekdays ===
(On weekdays, the Polyeleos takes place in the center of the church with the clergy standing around the icon of the feast. The hymns are set in various Tones, depending upon the taste of the hymnographers)

Polyeleos (Psalms 134 and 135; or Psalm 44, if it is a Great Feast of the Theotokos)
Megalynarion of the feast
Little Ektenia
Sessional Hymn (or Ypakoë if it is a Great Feast of the Lord)
Anavathmoi—almost always the first antiphon in Tone 4
Prokeimenon in the Tone of the Week
"Let every breath praise the Lord" in the same tone as the Prokeimenon
Matins Gospel—a lesson which is specific to the feast day
Psalm 50
Troparia following Psalm 50—speicific to the feast
The "Great Intercession"—an extended petition, to which the choir respond, Kyrie Eleison 40 times

== Rank of feast ==
In the Orthodox ranking of feasts, a day of "Polyeleos" rank is a "Middle feast", ranking above a Great Doxology, and below an All-Night Vigil. In liturgical calendars it is symbolized by a Greek cross printed in red.

== Chandelier ==
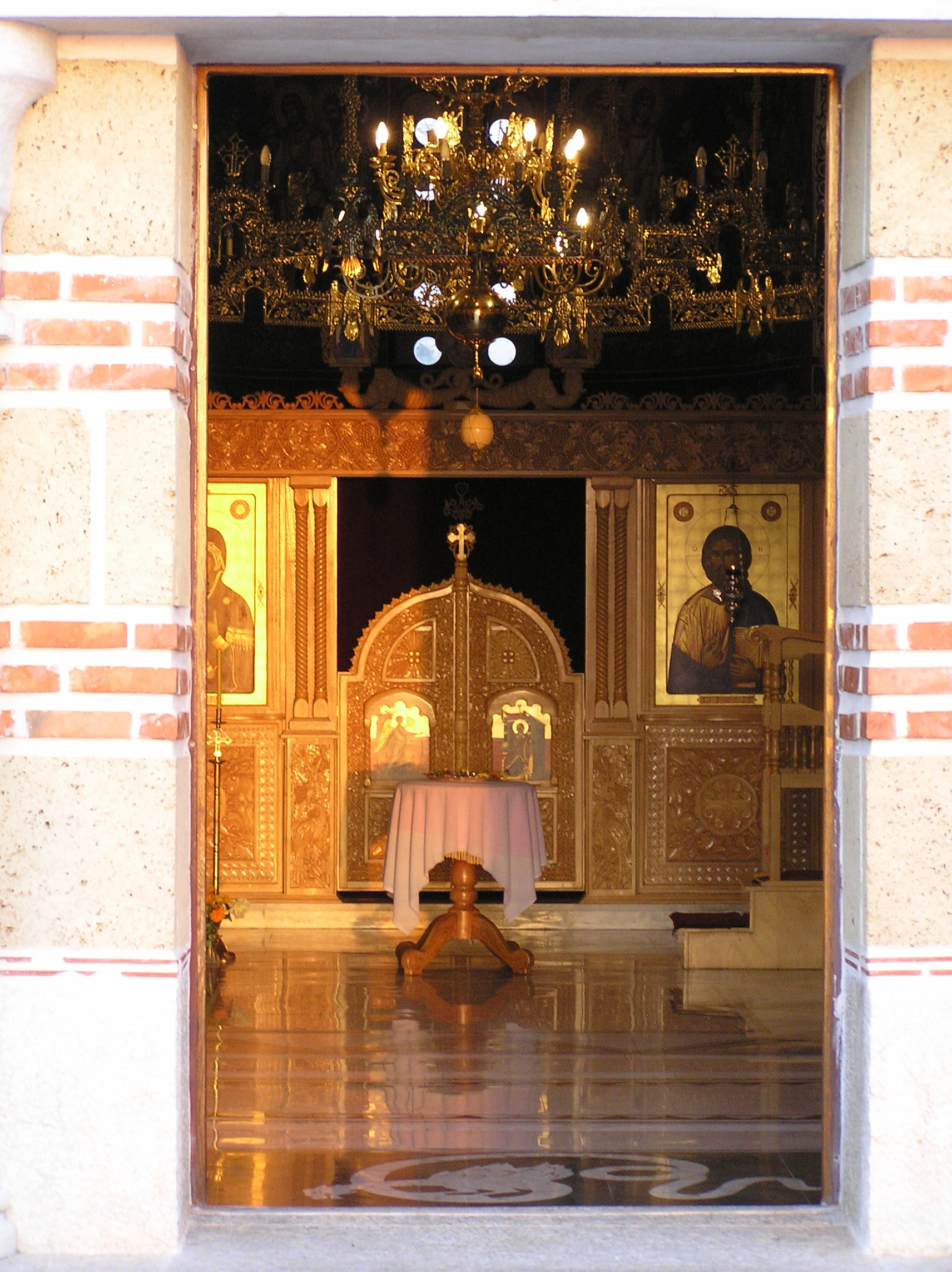
Polyelaios chandelier above the Holy Doors at Serbian Orthodox Church, Trebinje, Republic of Srpska.

It is in the form of a very large circle (also called a corona or horos) with many candles on it, and is often adorned with icons of numerous saints. The chandelier, or "polyelaios" ("having much oil", a pun on polyeleos) is suspended by a chain from the ceiling. During the chanting of the Polyeleos psalms (134 and 135), all of the candles are lit and it is pushed with a rod so that it turns back and forth during the singing to symbolize the presence of the angels which will only add to the joy of the service. This practice is still seen in the monasteries of Mount Athos and in other traditional Orthodox monasteries throughout the world.
