= Blazhen Muzh =

Setting of verses 1, 2 and 3

"Blazhen Muzh" (Church Slavonic: Блаженъ мужъ, "Blessed is the Man") is a setting of verses from Psalms 1, 2, and 3 taken from the Byzantine (Eastern Orthodox and Greek-Catholic) tradition of Vespers.

As with many of the Psalms and hymns, "Blazhen Muzh" attracted the attention of composers. Alexander Kastalsky produced a musical setting of it to be performed at the Dormition Cathedral.

== Text of the hymn ==
The version below is the one set by Sergei Rachmaninoff in his All-Night Vigil.

| Original (Russian Orthodox Church) | Romanisation | English translation |
|---|---|---|
| Блажен муж, иже не иде на совет нечестивых. | Blazhen muzh, izhe ne ide na sovet nechestivykh. | Blessed is the man, who walks not in the counsel of the wicked. |
| Аллилуиа, аллилуиа, аллилуиа. | Allilujia, allilujia, allilujia. | Alleluia, alleluia, alleluia. |
| Яко весть Господь путь праведных, и путь нечестивых погибнет. | Jako vest' Gospod' put' pravednykh, i put' nechestivykh pogibnet. | For the Lord knows the way of the righteous, but the way of the wicked will perish. |
| Аллилуиа, аллилуиа, аллилуиа. | Allilujia, allilujia, allilujia. | Alleluia, alleluia, alleluia. |
| Работайте Господеви со страхом и радуйтеся Ему с трепетом. | Rabotajte Gospodevi so strakhom i radujtesja Emu s trepetom. | Serve the Lord with fear and rejoice in Him with trembling. |
| Аллилуиа, аллилуиа, аллилуиа. | Allilujia, allilujia, allilujia. | Alleluia, alleluia, alleluia. |
| Блажени вси надеющиися Нань. | Blazheni vsi nadejushchiisja Nan'. | Blessed are all who take refuge in him. |
| Аллилуиа, аллилуиа, аллилуиа. | Allilujia, allilujia, allilujia. | Alleluia, alleluia, alleluia. |
| Воскресни, Господи, спаси мя, Боже мой. | Voskresni, Gospodi, spasi mja, Bozhe moj. | Arise, O Lord! Save me, O my God! |
| Аллилуиа, аллилуиа, аллилуиа. | Allilujia, allilujia, allilujia. | Alleluia, alleluia, alleluia. |
| Господне есть спасение и на людех Твоих благословение Твое. | Gospodne est' spasenie i na ljudekh Tvoikh blagoslovenie Tvoe. | Salvation is of the Lord; and Thy blessing is upon Thy people. |
| Аллилуиа, аллилуиа, аллилуиа. | Allilujia, allilujia, allilujia. | Alleluia, alleluia, alleluia. |
| Слава Отцу и Сыну и Святому Духу, и ныне и присно и во веки веков. Аминь. | Slava Otcu i Synu i Svjatomu Dukhu, i nyne i prisno i vo veki vekov. Amin'. | Glory to the Father, and to the Son, and to the Holy Spirit, both now and ever and unto the ages of ages. Amen. |
| Аллилуиа, аллилуиа, аллилуиа. Слава Тебе, Боже. | Allilujia, allilujia, allilujia. Slava Tebe, Bozhe. | Alleluia, alleluia, alleluia, glory to Thee, O God! |
| Аллилуиа, аллилуиа, аллилуиа. Слава Тебе, Боже. | Allilujia, allilujia, allilujia. Slava Tebe, Bozhe. | Alleluia, alleluia, alleluia, glory to Thee, O God! |
| Аллилуиа, аллилуиа, аллилуиа. Слава Тебе, Боже. | Allilujia, allilujia, allilujia. Slava Tebe, Bozhe. | Alleluia, alleluia, alleluia, glory to Thee, O God! |
