= Lity in Eastern Christianity =

Festive religious procession

The lity or litya (λιτή, liti, "a fervent prayer") is a festive religious procession, followed by intercessions, which augments great vespers (or, a few times a year, great compline) in the Eastern Orthodox and Byzantine Catholic churches on important feast days (and, at least according to the written rubrics, any time there is an all-night vigil). Following a lity is another liturgical action, an artoklasia, and either of these terms may be used to describe both liturgical actions collectively.

== Procession ==
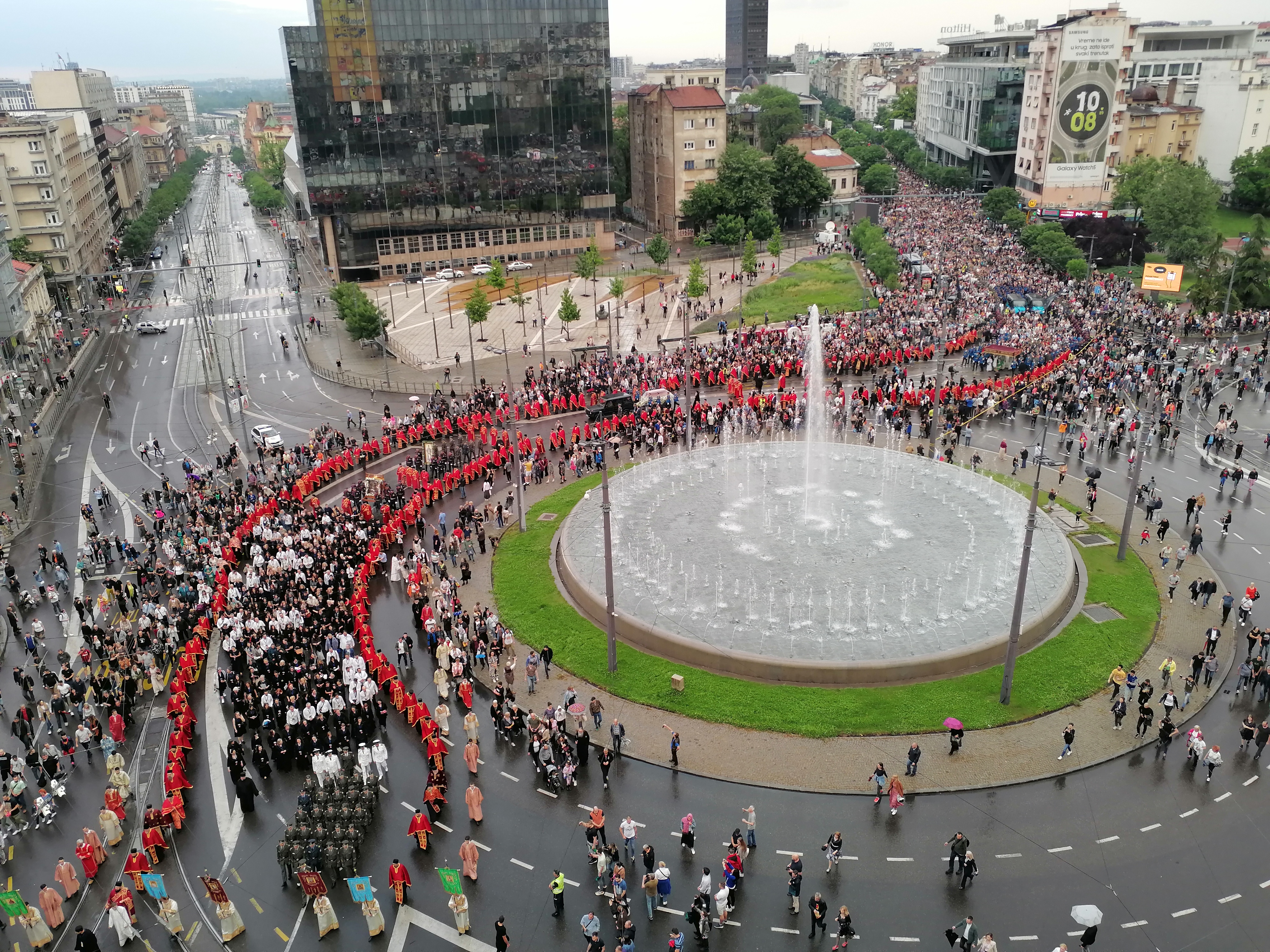
Belgrade, 2023.

At vespers, after the Prayer at the Bowing of Heads, the procession commences: the clergy, including a deacon with a censer and, when logistically possible, the chanters, the process to the narthex of the church during which are sung stichera of the feast and/or of the patron of the church. Once the procession reaches the narthex and the stichera have been sung, the deacon begins a series of lengthy petitions (these are the "lity" proper), asking for the intercession of many saints, and praying for the church and the world:

...For the salvation of the people; for the [governmental authorities]; for the clergy; for all afflicted Christian souls desirous of aid; for this city, the country and all Christians living therein; for our deceased fathers and brethren; for deliverance from famine, epidemics, earthquake, flood, fire, the sword, the invasion of barbarians and civil strife....".

"Lord, have mercy" (kyrie eleison) is sung multiple times after each petition, and this is followed by the priest reciting a prayer summarizing the petitions.

After this, the priests and deacons proceed to the artoklasia table which will have been placed in the center of the nave, all others return to their usual places, and vespers continues as usual with the Aposticha (even if the Lity is celebrated in conjunction with compline, the services ends as vespers).

=== Outside the church building ===
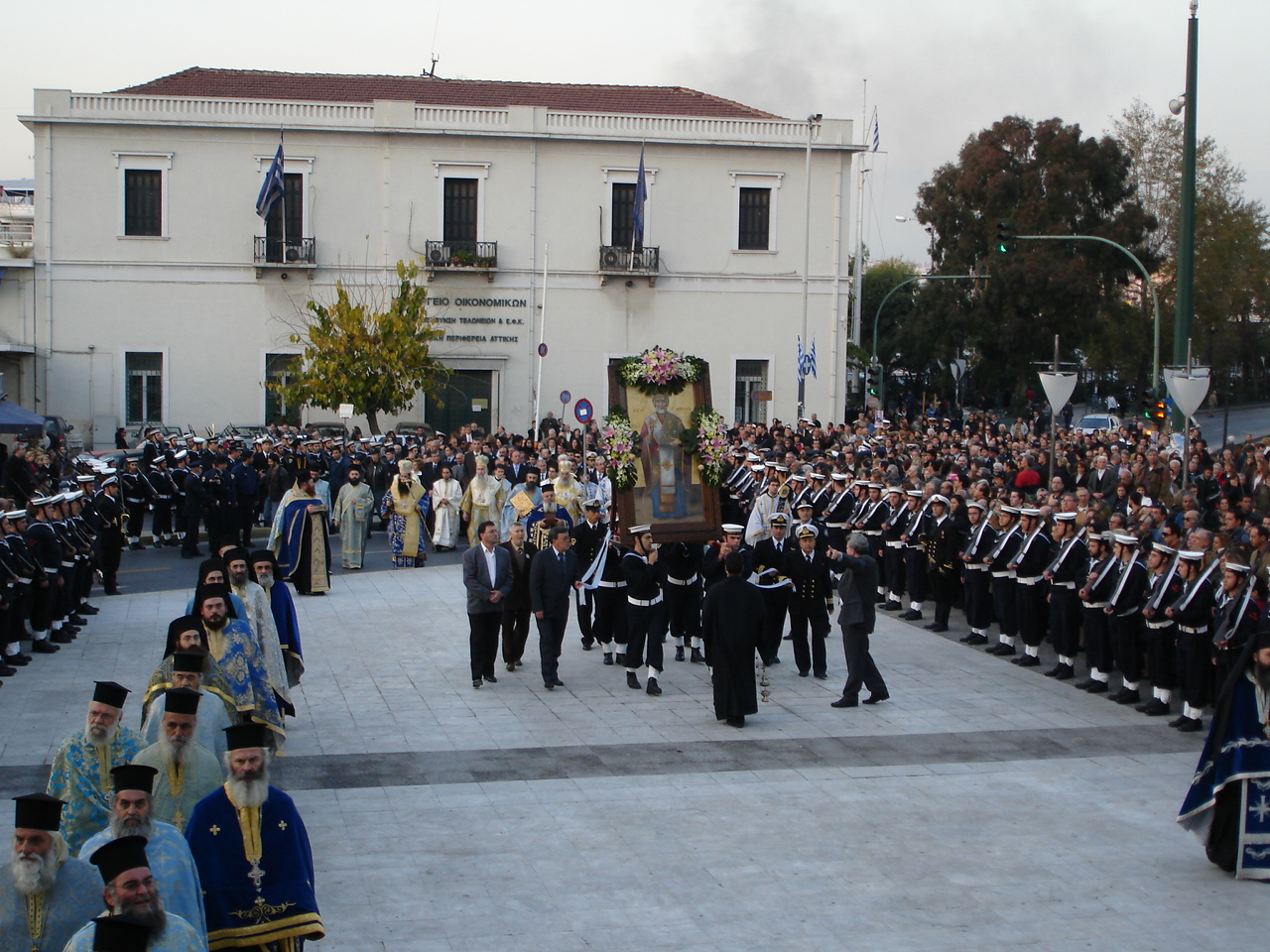
Lity procession on the Feast of Saint Nicholas in Piraeus, Greece.

Occasionally the lity is held outdoors. In places it is the custom to process around the church, the first and fifth intercessions being sung in front of the entrance and the other three intercessions being sung at each of the other three sides. For special festivity or on other occasions, e.g., or in times of public calamity, the lity may be held in fields (in case of famine) or in public squares or city halls, in which instance the procession that otherwise would be to the narthex of the church continues to wherever the lity is held.

== Artoklasia ==
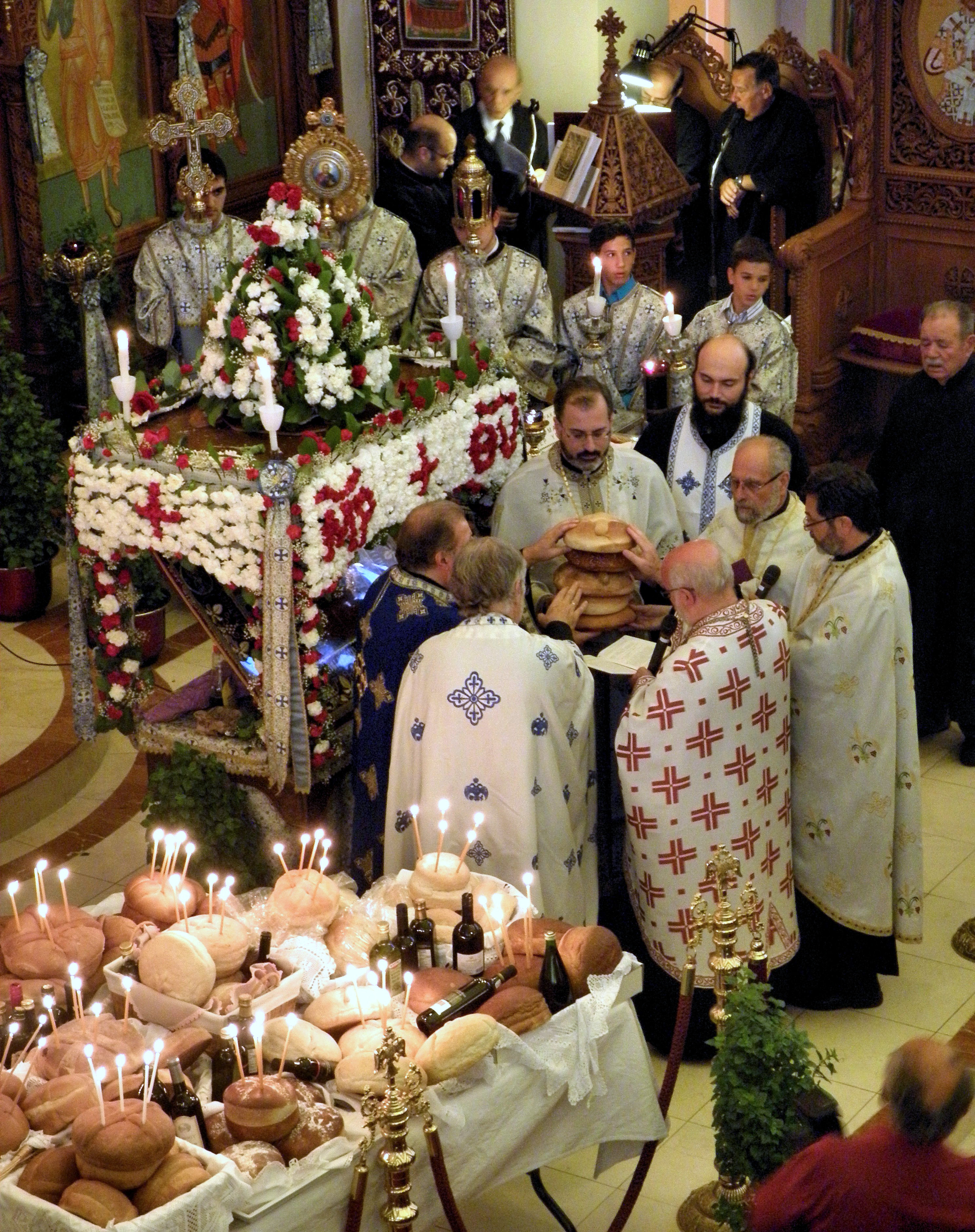
Artoklasia service, with bottles of wine and olive oil. The five loaves are reminiscent of the five loaves that Jesus Christ blessed in the desert, which in turn signified the five books of Moses (Pentateuch).

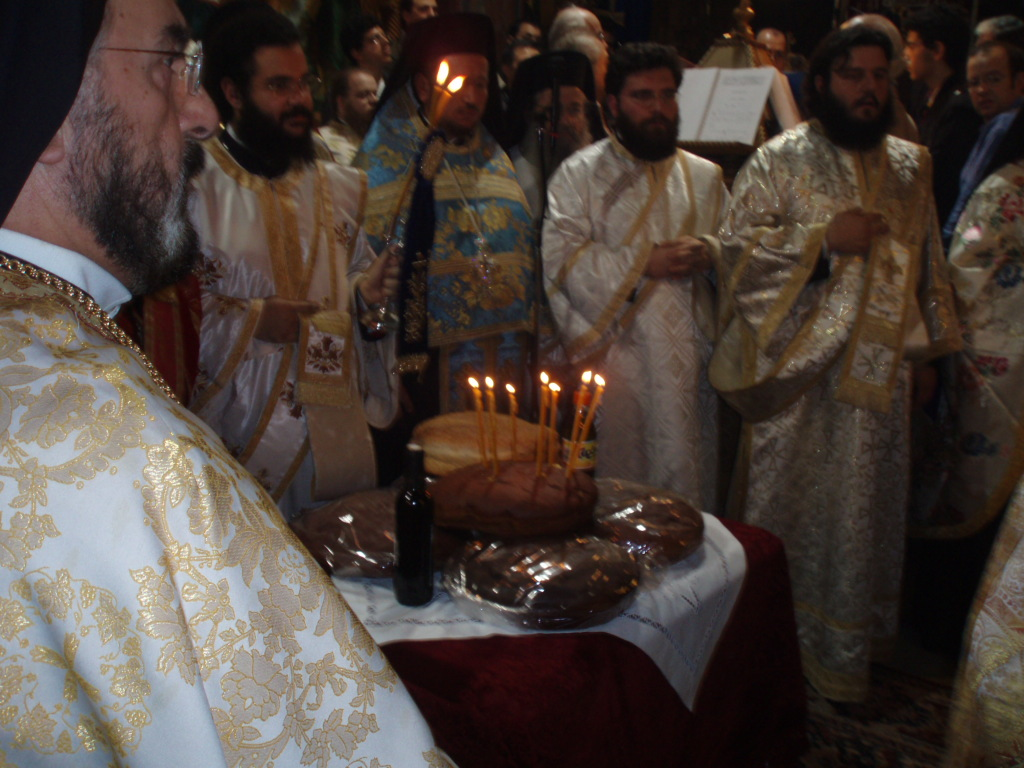
Artoklasia table with loaves of bread and bottles of wine and olive oil

After the lity the priests and deacons go to the middle of the church to a table prepared beforehand with five loaves of leavened bread, the artoklasia loaves, bottles of wine and olive oil and, in the Russian tradition, also a dish containing wheat kernels.

While the apolytikia (dismissal hymns) are sung — and the rubrics always mandate exactly three such hymns when there is a lity — the deacon circles the artoklasia table, censing the offerings thereon, during each, three times in all. Thereafter the priest uncovers his head and takes up one of the five loaves in his right hand, while he says the prayer:

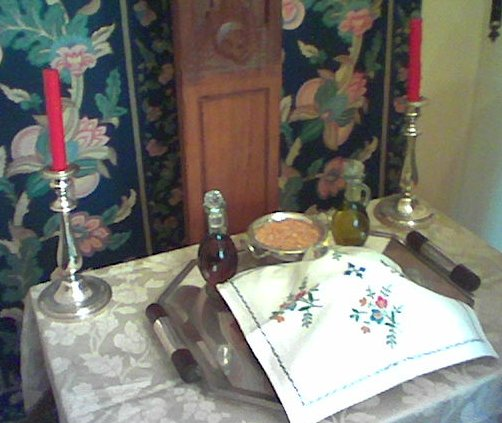
Artoklasia table in the Russian tradition. The five loaves in the front are covered with an embroidered cloth. At the back center is a dish of wheat, and at the sides are a vessel of olive oil and a cruet of wine.

O Lord Jesus Christ our God, Who didst bless the five loaves and didst therewith feed the five thousand: Do Thou, the same Lord, bless these loaves, wheat, wine and oil; and multiply them in this holy habitation, and in all the world; and sanctify all the faithful who shall partake of them. For it is Thou, O Christ our God, Who dost bless and sanctify all things; and unto Thee we ascribe glory: with the Father Who hath no beginning, and Thine all-holy, good, and life-creating Spirit, now and ever, and unto the ages of ages.

During the words "loaves, wheat, wine and oil" above, he points with the loaf he holds in his right hand to each item as he names it, making thereby the sign of the cross. Then he breaks the loaf he holds in his hand.

The vespers resumes as usual with "Blessed be the name of the Lord" but followed by Psalm 33(34), "I will bless the Lord at all times...".

The typicon directs that subsequently the reading of the life of the saint whose feast it is to be read or, on a Sunday, a selection from the New Testament. (Note: "From the Sunday of Pascha to the Sunday of All Saints, the Acts of the Apostles is read. On the remaining Sundays of the year are read seven Catholic Epistles of the Apostles, and the fourteen Epistles of the Holy Apostle Paul, and the Apocalypse of Saint John the Theologian.") During this time all sit and the a piece of the blessed bread and a cup of the blessed wine are given to each to provide nourishment to sustain him through the rest of the vigil with the caveat that they are to be consumed straightway so as to keep the fast before Communion. While this custom is still observed in some monasteries, notably on Mount Athos, usually nowadays the blessed bread is simply distributed to the faithful when they exit the service; however, in the Russian tradition, at matins following the singing of Psalm 50(51), all come forward to venerate the Gospel Book (if it is Sunday) or the icon of the feast, and each person is anointed and given a piece of the blessed bread dipped in the wine.

By sundry local customs, the wheat may be ground into flour, often for making prosphora, or may be reserved until the time of sowing.

=== Paschal Vigil ===
A modified artoklasia without any lity follows vespers on Holy Saturday. Since the rubrics for fasting proscribe oil that day, only bread and wine are blessed, and these are distributed to each together with "six dates or figs"; nowadays, however, the dates and figs are generally only distributed in monasteries where they are typically consumed with other minimalistic sustenance in the refectory.

=== Alternate Byzantine Catholic usage ===
In some Catholic sources, artoklasia was wrongly identified with the Latin practice of "Benediction of the Blessed Sacrament," in which the consecrated Eucharist is exposed for the worship of the faithful. The service of artoklasia might have fallen into disuse for at time among Byzantine Catholics but never was it confused with "Benediction of the Blessed Sacrament. At least in these days, lity with artoklasia is regularly celebrated among Byzantine Catholics for feasts, albeit with various degrees of fidelity to the rubrics.

== History and origins ==
The lity takes place in the narthex so that the catechumens and penitents, who in ancient times were not allowed to enter the nave, could participate in the joy and blessings of the feast and the faithful would follow the clergy into the narthex to show their humility and brotherly love towards the catechumens and penitents.

Two possible explanations have been suggested for the origins of this procession. The fourth century pilgrim Egeria states that after Vespers at the Tomb of Christ a procession would go to the site of Calvary where further prayers were said after which the congregation were dismissed. At the monastery of Mar Sabbas in the Judaean wilderness at the end of Vespers the monks would go to the tomb of St. Sabbas where the lity prayers would be said. In fact, the latter tradition may have been a monastic adaptation of the Jerusalem practice and since the liturgical traditions of the monastic community of Mar Sabbas became of central importance in the development of the Byzantine liturgical traditions, especially after the thirteenth century, the lity would have spread to the rest of the Byzantine world from there. The processions at the end of Vespers are also found in the Ambrosian Rite and formerly during the Easter Octure in the Norbertine Rite.
