= Vasari Singers =

- Origin: London, England
- Genres: Classical choral music
- Years active: 1981–present
- Website: www.vasarisingers.org

Vasari Singers is one of the UK's leading chamber choirs, led from its founding by Jeremy Backhouse. Vasari performs regularly in most of London’s major concert venues and taken part in numerous commercial concerts and festivals, including the BBC Proms and the choir has appeared on BBC Radio 3 The choir is acclaimed for its versatility, performing choral music from a wide range of styles and eras, from the Renaissance to contemporary. As well as concerts, taking part in choral evensong is a major feature of Vasari’s schedule. The choir sings regularly in Canterbury Cathedral other main English Cathedrals, with recent visits to Gloucester Cathedral, Liverpool Cathedral and Ripon Cathedral. New music is central to the choir’s activities, and since 2000 has commissioned over 20 works from British composers. In 2005 Vasari celebrated its 25th anniversary with 10 new commissions, a recording of these and other 21st-century anthems and a world première concert at St John’s, Smith Square.

In November 2008, the group commissioned and premièred a new a capella Requiem by the British Composer Gabriel Jackson. which they later recorded.

Naxos Records have now released five Vasari Singers albums, two of which have achieved top ten status in the Specialist Classical Charts.
