= Prokeimenon =

Orthodox liturgical practice

In the liturgical practice of the Orthodox Church and the Byzantine Rite, a prokeimenon (Greek Προκείμενον, plural prokeimena; sometimes prokimenon/prokimena; lit. 'that which precedes') is a psalm or canticle refrain sung responsorially at certain specified points of the Divine Liturgy or the Divine Office, usually to introduce a scripture reading. It corresponds to the Gradual of the Roman Mass.

== Use ==
Prokeimena are not selected based on the personal preference of the priest, reader, or choir director. Rather, the Sunday and weekday prokeimena are taken from the Octoechos, using the particular tone of the day. Many feasts also have their own prokeimena.

The basic pattern of a prokeimenon is for the reader to chant a single verse of the psalm or canticle (often announcing the tone as well). This is repeated as a refrain by the choir, as the Reader chants additional verses (exactly how many depends on local practice), followed by the choir singing the first verse in response. The Reader concludes the prokeimenon by chanting the first half of the first verse, and the choir then sings the second half. Alternately, if a feast is being celebrated together with a Sunday liturgy, a verse of that feast's prokeimenon will often replace the final verse of the Sunday prokeimenon.

In some traditions where a plain chant format is used, the prokeimenon may be chanted by a cantor. In this practice, the cantor will sing the refrained verse in the prescribed tone for the Sunday or Feastday along with the accompanying additional verses. This is usually done in alternation (refrain – verse – refrain – verse – refrain).

== Example ==
The example given is the Sunday prokeimenon in Tone 8, assuming no additional feast. The verses are taken from Psalm 75 (Septuagint numbering).

Reader: "The prokeimenon is in the eighth tone: Pray and make your vows before the Lord our God!"
Choir: "Pray and make your vows before the Lord our God!"
Reader: "In Judah, God is known; His name is great in Israel!"
Choir: "Pray and make your vows before the Lord our God!"
Reader: "Pray and make your vows!"
Choir: "Before the Lord our God!"

== Liturgical structure ==
In the Divine Liturgy, the prokeimenon always precedes the Epistle reading, after the singing of the Trisagion.

At Vespers, the prokeimenon always follows the Entrance, whether or not there is an Old Testament reading to follow. Whenever there is a Gospel reading, whether at Matins or during a Moleben, it will be preceded by a prokeimenon. (The exception to this being at Matins during Holy Week, when the Gospel reading immediately follows the Psalter readings, or the troparion on Holy Thursday.) In Lent and Holy Week, at the Sixth Hour, a prokeimenon is also sung both before and after a reading from the books of Isaiah or Ezekiel.
