= List of composers of Russian sacred music =

Composers of Russian sacred music List

This is a list of composers of Russian sacred music, also called sacral music or religious music (see also Russian Orthodox Church), alphabetically sorted by surname, then by other names. It consists primarily, but not exclusively, of Russian composers, also of Ukraine and Belarus and other countries in tradition of Eastern Orthodoxy (especially of the Russian Empire and his successors). For a long time the Russian sacred music wascentered around the St. Peterburg Court Chapel (the Court Chapel Choir or Kapella).

The following list of composers is by no means complete. It is limited to composers of sacred (sacral/religious) music. Some names are given together with the religious title (Archimandrit, Archpriest, Deacon, Hieromonk, Metropolitan, Protopsaltis etc.). For lists of (non-religious) music by music composers by other classifications, see lists of composers.

List

== A ==
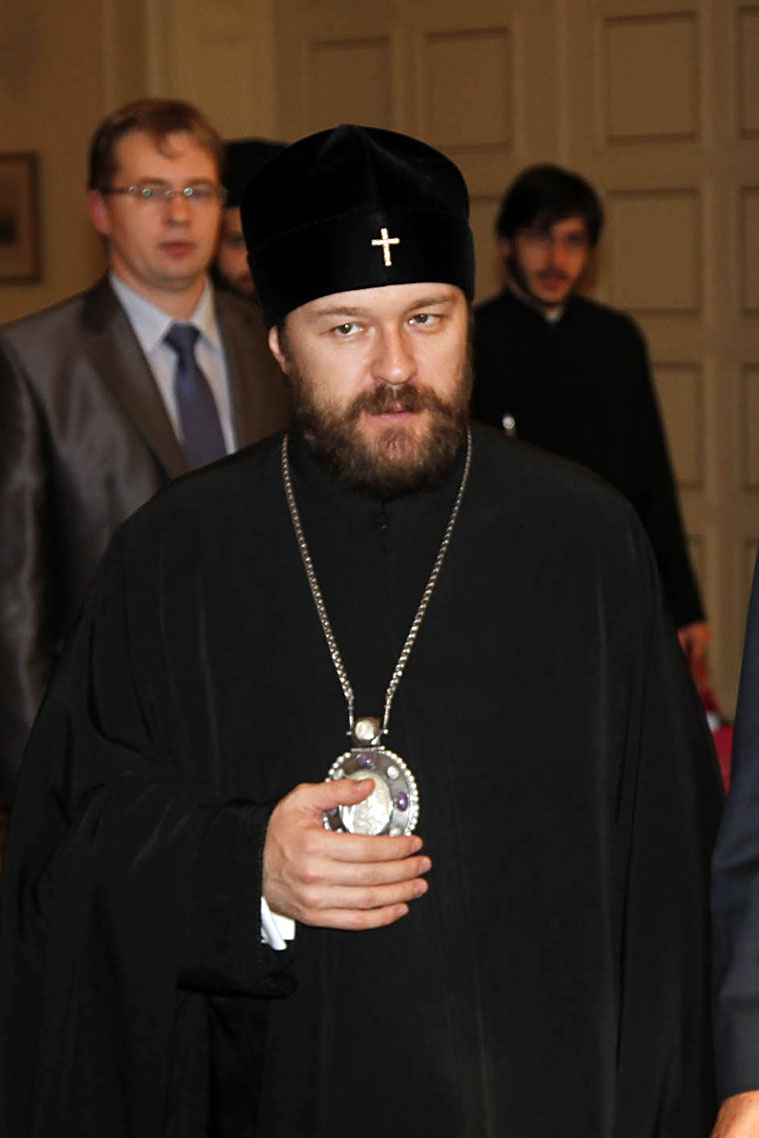
Hilarion Alfeyev, 2011

- Archimandrit Feofan Aleksandrov (1785–1852) (ru)
- Metropolitan Hilarion Alfeyev (1966–)
- Archpriest Dmitry Allemanov (1867–1928)
- Aleksandr Andreyev-Oksar (1883? – after 1945)
- Maia Aprahamian (1935–2011)
- Anton Arensky (1861–1906)
- Alexander Arkhangelsky (1846–1924)
- Evstafy Azeyev (1851–1918) (ru)

== B ==
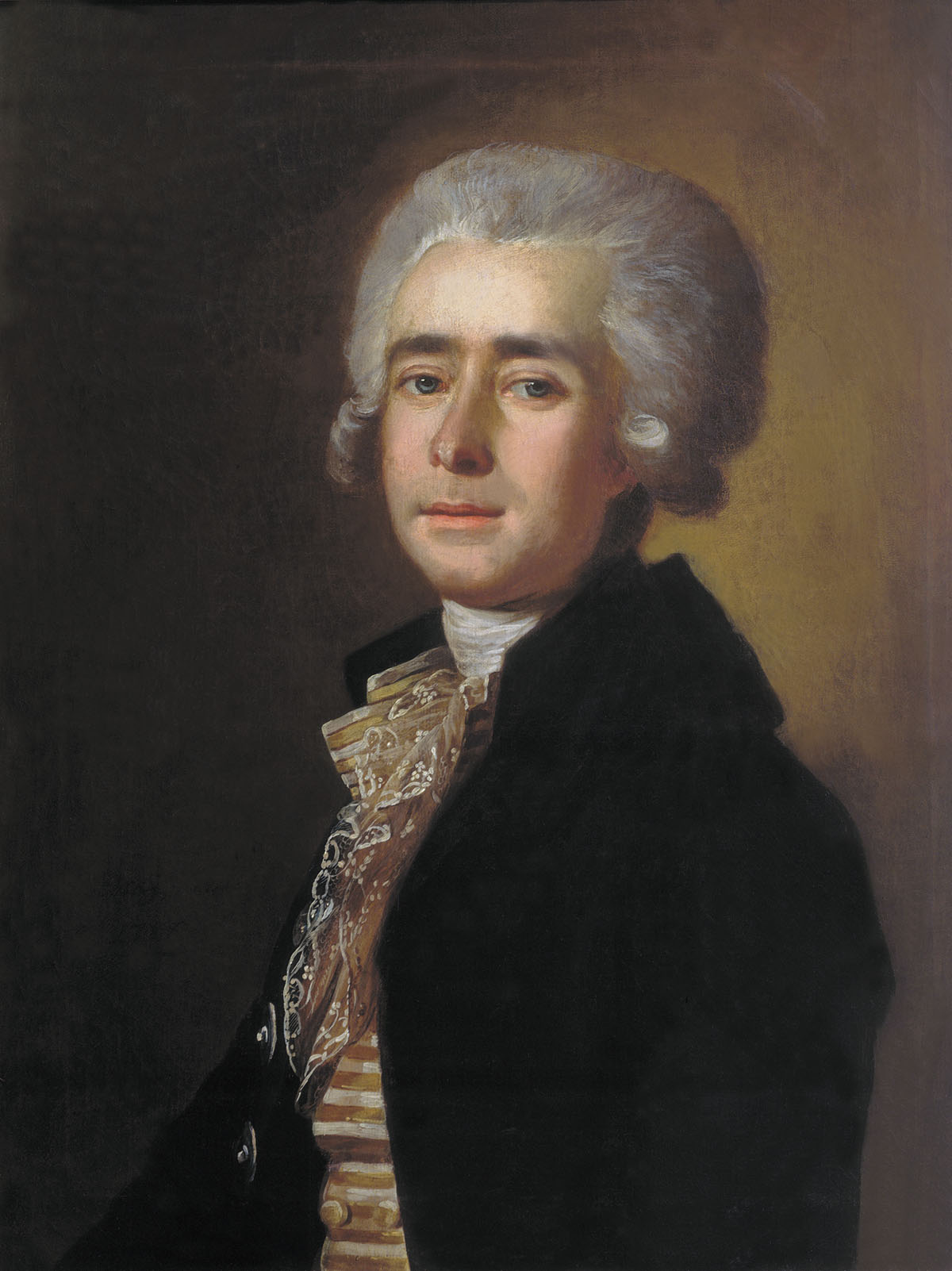
Dmitry Bortniansky

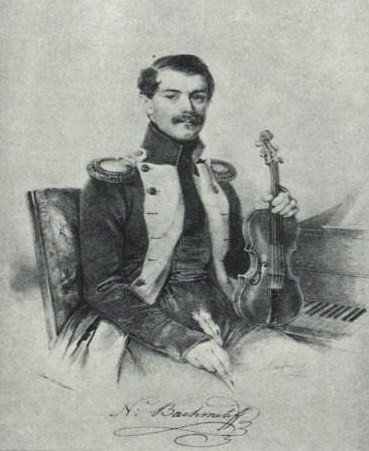
Nikolai Bakhmetev

- A. Badev (fl. 19th c.)
- Nikolai Bakhmetev (1807-1891)
- Miliy Balakirev (1837–1910)
- Vasil Barvinskiy (1888–1963)
- Maksim Berezovsky (1745–1777)
- Hieromonk Nafanail Bochkalo (1866–?)
- Dmitry Bortniansky (1751–1825)

== C ==
- Alexander Chesnokov (1880–1941)
- Pavel Chesnokov (1877–1944)
- César Cui (1835–1918)

== D ==
- Alexander Sergejewitsch Dargomyschski (1813–1869)
- Stepan Davydov (1777–1825)
- Stepan Degtyarev (1766–1813)
- Nikolai Diletsky (c. 1630–1680)
- Pavel Dragomirov-Tolstiakov (1880–1938)
- Ivan Dvoretsky (mid-19th c.)
- Nikolai Diletsky (1630–1680)

== F ==
- Boris Feoktistov (1941–)

== G ==
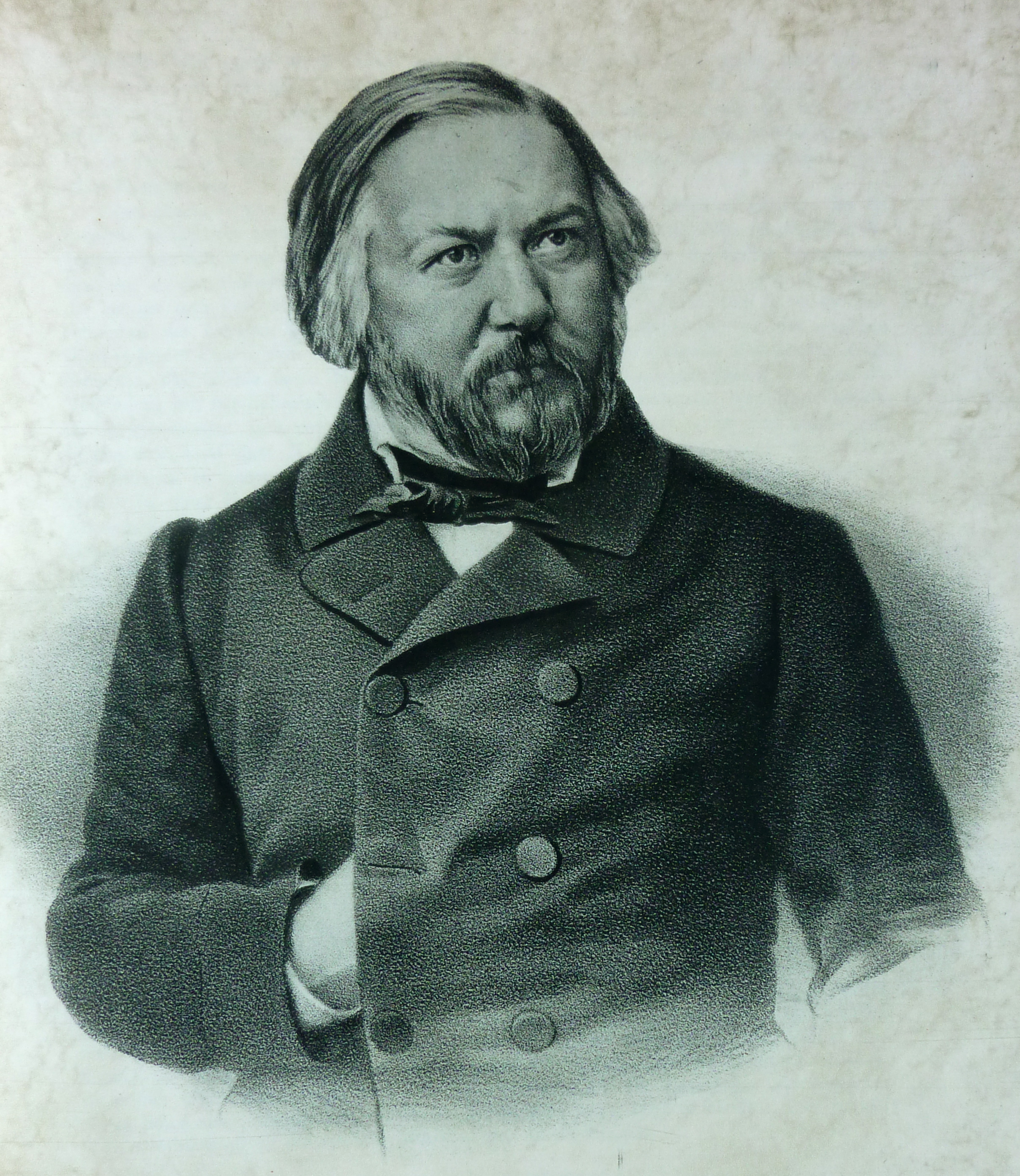
Mikhail Glinka

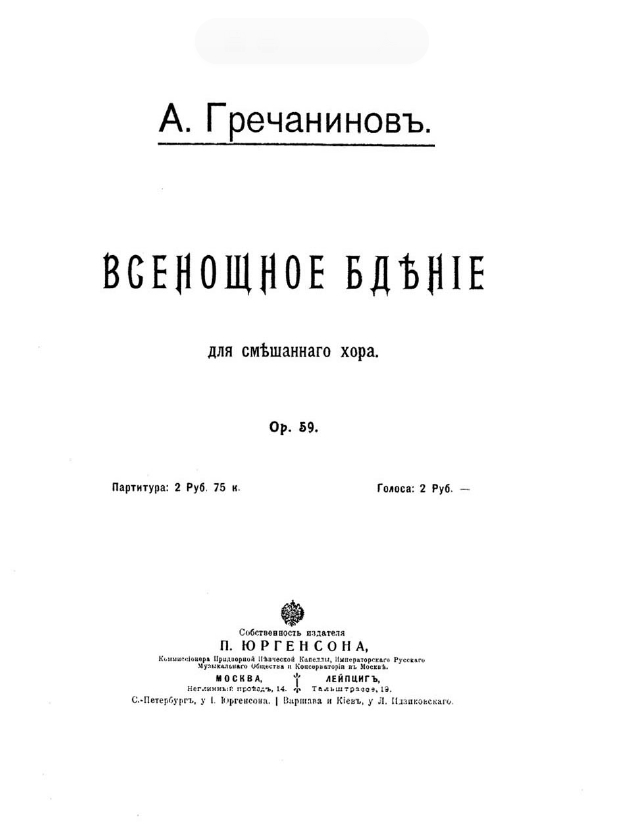
All-Night Vigil (ru) of Alexander Grechaninov

- Baldassare Galuppi (1706–1785)
- Johann von Gardner (Ivan Gardner) (1898–1984)
- Valery Gavrilin (1939–1999)
- Archpriest Sergei Glagolev (1928–2021)
- Alexander Glazunov (1865–1936)
- Reinhold Glière (1875–1956)
- Mikhail Glinka (1804–1857)
- Nikolai Golovanov (1891–1953)
- Alexander Grechaninov (1864–1956)

== H ==
- Dobri Hristov (1875–1941)
- Roman Hurko (1962–)

== I ==
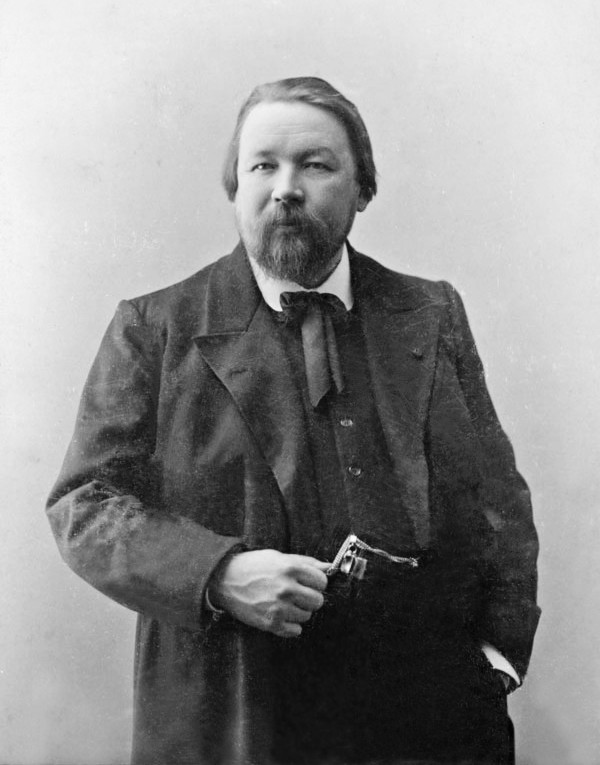
Mikhail Ippolitov-Ivanov

- Andrei Ilyashenko (1884–1954)
- Mikhail Ippolitov-Ivanov (1859–1935)
- Pavel Ivanov-Radkevich (1878–1942)
- Priest Georgi Izvekov (1874–1937)

== K ==
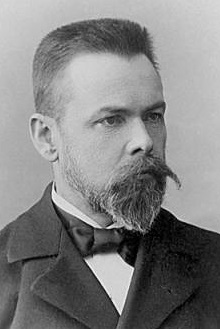
Alexander Kastalsky

- Nikolai Kachanov
- Protopsaltis I. Kaikov
- Victor Kalinnikov (1870–1927)
- Valery Kalistratov (1942–)
- Alexander Kastalsky (1856–1926)
- Nikolay Kedrov Jr. (1905–1981)
- Nikolay Kedrov Sr. (1871–1940)
- Nikolai Kompaneisky (1848–1910)
- Aleksandr Kopylov (1854–1911)
- Maxim Kovalevsky (1903–1988)

== L ==
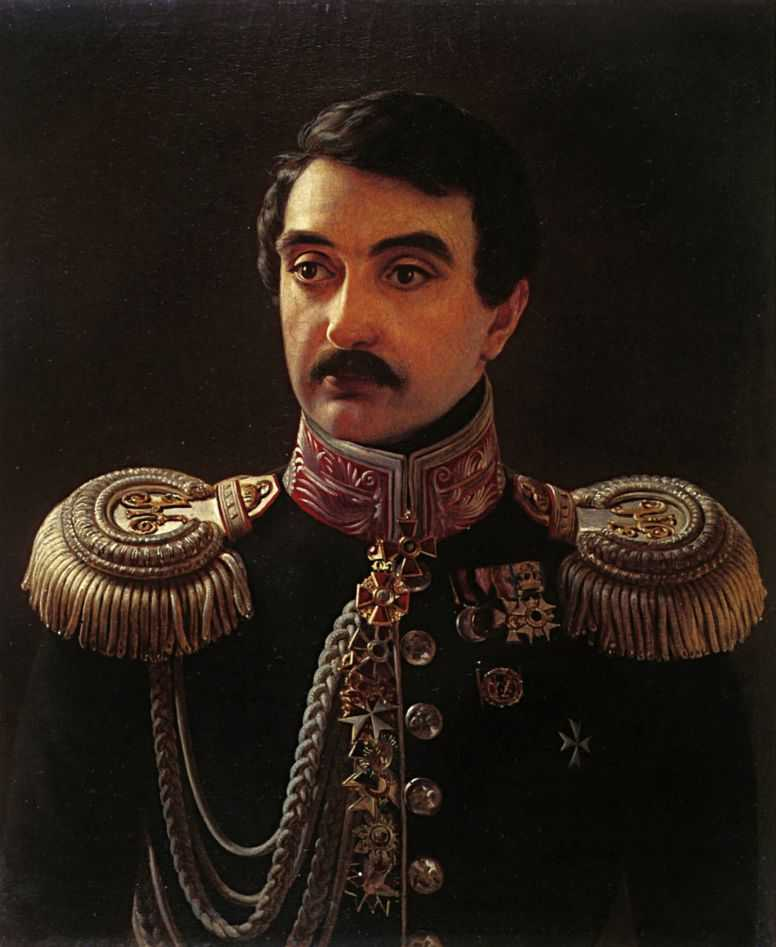
Alexei Lvov, Maestro of the Imperial Chapel in St Petersburg

- Alexei Larin (1954–)
- Boris Ledkovsky (1894–1975)
- Mykola Leontovych (1877–1921)
- Anatoly Liadov (1855–1914)
- Sergei Liapunov (1859–1924)
- Archpriest Mikhail Lisitsyn (1872–1918)
- Gavriil Lomakin (1812–1885)
- Alexei Lvov (1799–1870)
- Grigory Lvovsky (1830–1894)

== M ==
- Pavel Makarov (mid-19th c.-)
- H. Manolov (fl. 20th c.)
- Vladimir Martynov (1946–)
- Archpriest Stephan Meholick (1904–1977)
- Archpriest Vasily Metallov (1862–1926)
- Priest Ivan Moody (1964–)
- Archimandrite Matfey Mormyl (1938–2009)
- Vladimir Morosan

== N ==
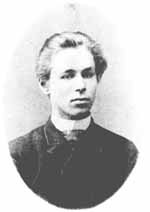
Alexander Nikolsky

- A. Nikolaev
- Alexander Nikolsky (1874–1943)
- Anatoly Novikov (1896–1984)

== O ==
- Walter G. Obleschuk

== P ==
- Zakaria Paliashvili (1871–1933)
- Semyon Panchenko (1867–1937)
- Petros Peloponnesios (1735–1800)
- Nikolai Potulov (1810–1873) (ru)
- Vadim Prokhorov

== R ==
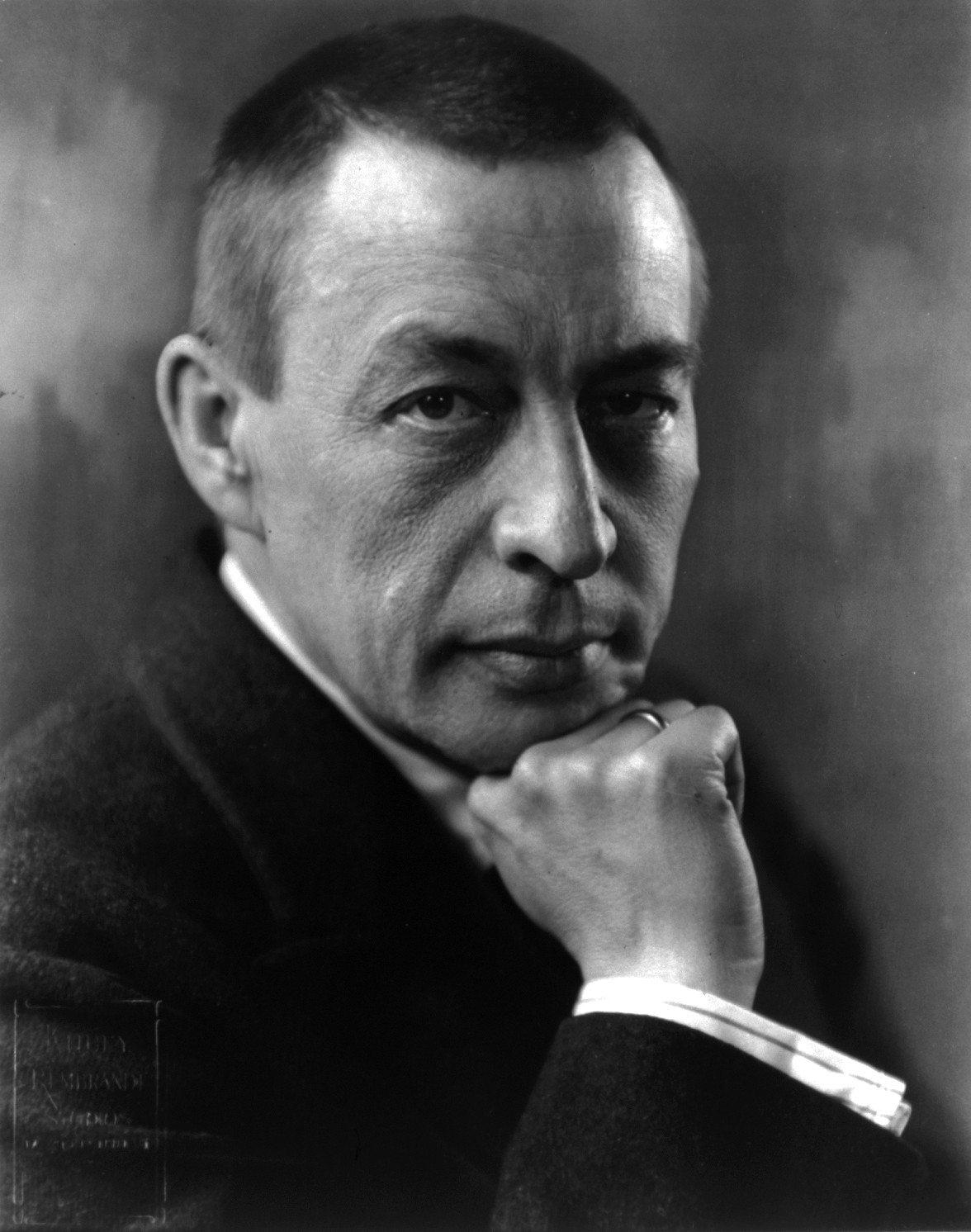
Sergei Rachmaninoff, composer of the Liturgy of St. John Chrysostom

- Sergei Rachmaninoff (1873–1943)
- Nikolai Rimsky-Korsakov (1844–1908)
- Anton Rubinstein (1829–1894)
- Feodosy Rubtsov (1904–1986)
- Alexander Ruggieri (1952–2012)

== S ==
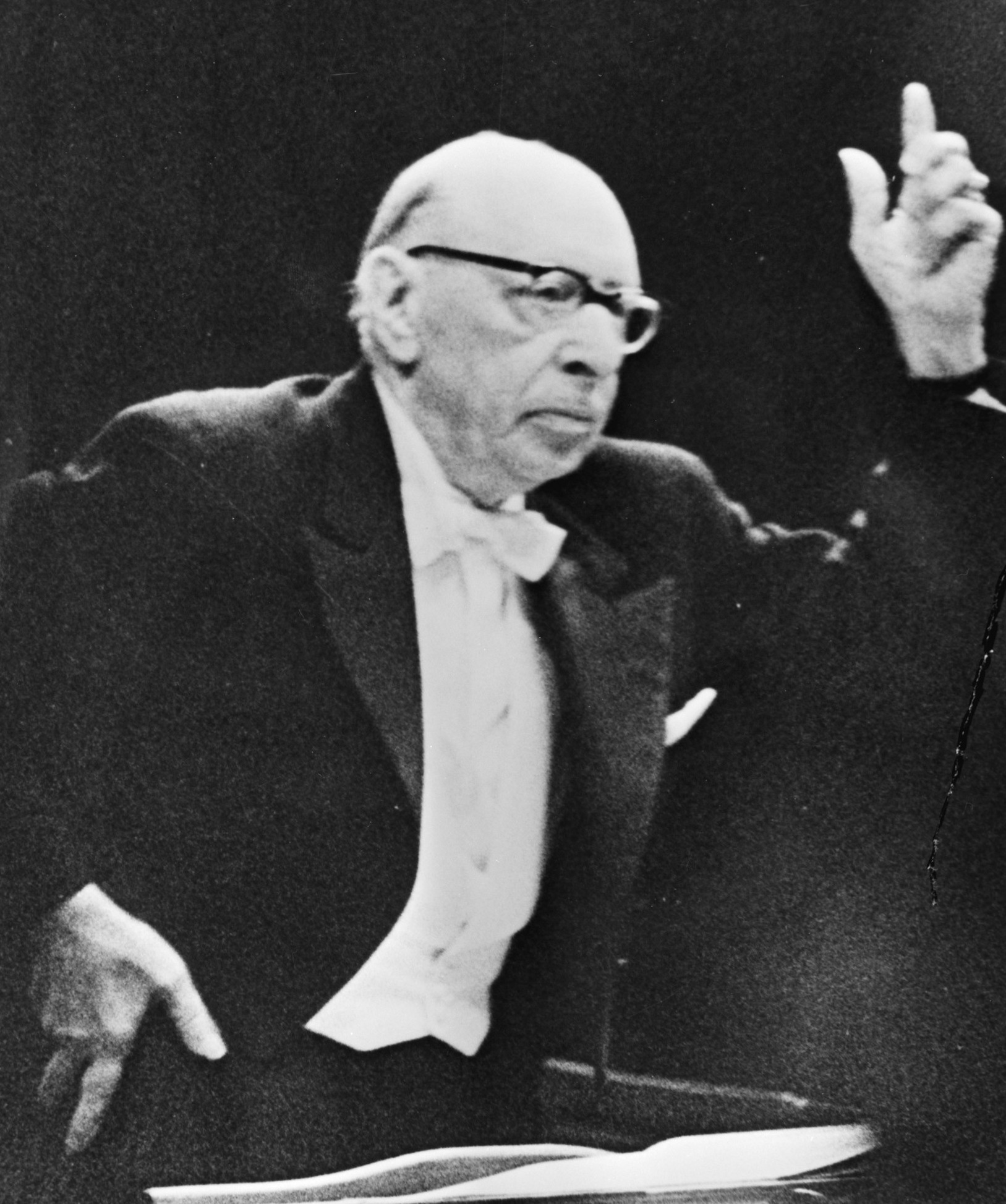
Igor Stravinsky, composer of the Symphony of Psalms

- Kurt Sander (1962–)
- Giuseppe Sarti (1729–1802)
- Vissarion Shebalin (1902–1963)
- Count Aleksandr Sheremetev (1859–1931)
- Constantine Shvedoff (1886–1954)
- Stepan Smolensky (1848–1909)
- Priest Vasily Starorussky
- Maximilian Steinberg (1883–1946)
- Fyodor Stepanov (1870 – after 1947)
- Kyrylo Stetsenko (1882–1922)
- Igor Stravinsky (1882–1971)
- Georgy Sviridov (1915–1998)

== T ==
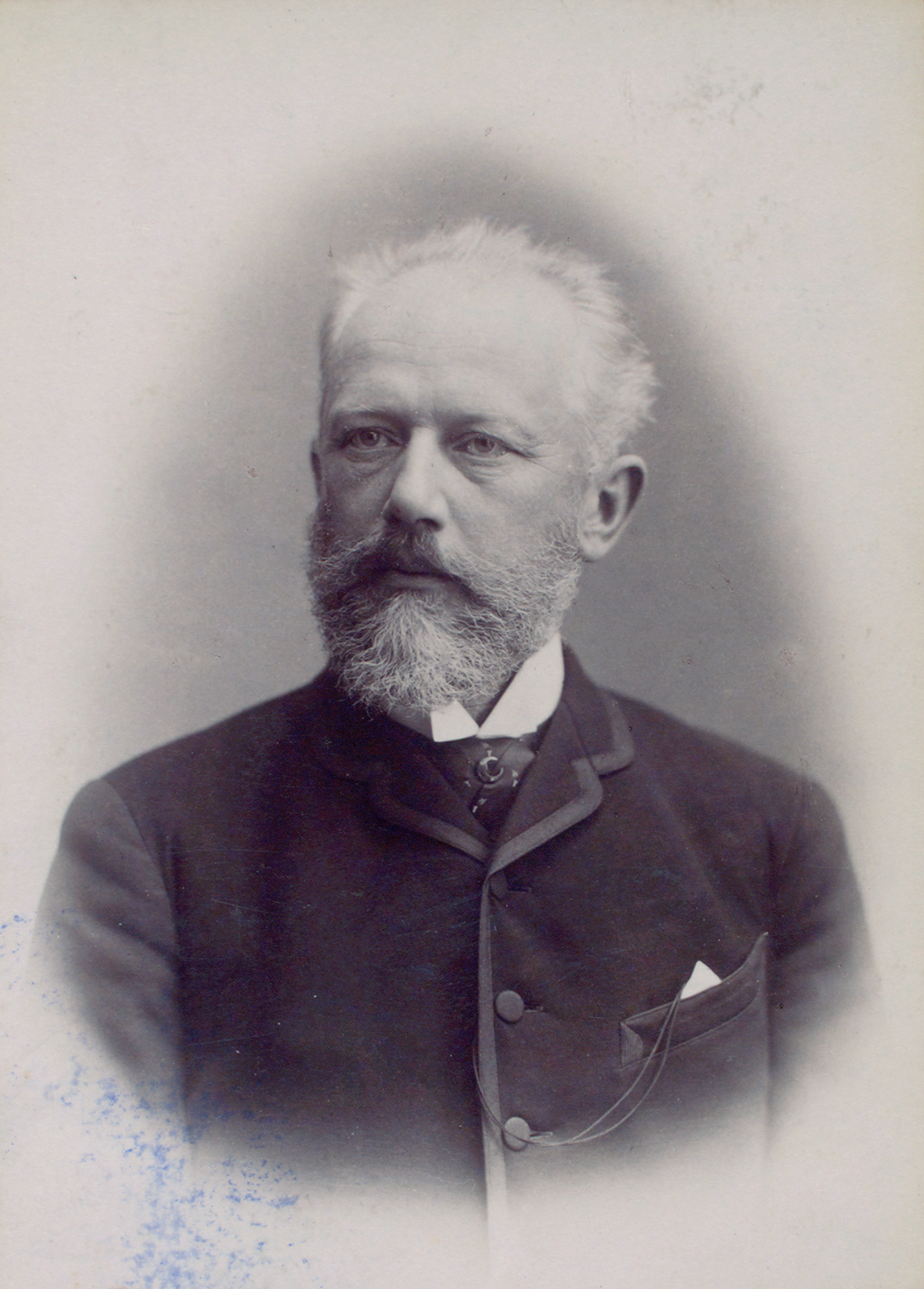
Pyotr Ilyich Tchaikovsky, composer of the Liturgy of St. John Chrysostom

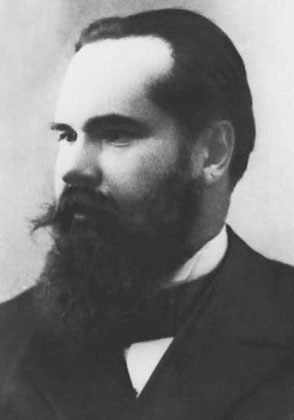
Sergei Taneyev (composer of At the Reading of a Psalm По прочтении псалма)

- Sergei Taneyev (1856–1915)
- Pyotr Tchaikovsky (1840–1893)
- Nikolai Tcherepnin (1873–1945)
- Vasily Titov (c. 1650–1715)
- Richard Toensing (1940–)
- Nikolai Tolstiakov (1883–1958)
- Deacon Sergius Trubachov (1919–1995)
- Archpriest Pyotr Turchaninov (1779–1856) (ru)
- Aleksei Turenkov (1886–1958)

== V ==
- Alexander Varlamov (1801–1848)
- Artemy Vedel (c. 1767–1808)
- Priest Mikhail Vinogradov (1809–1888)
- Anton Viskov (1965–)
- Pavel Vorotnikov (1804–1876)
- Hieromonk Viktor Vysotsky (1791–1871)

== Y ==
- Dmitry Yaichkov (1869–1953)
- Yakiv Yatsynevych (1869–1945)
- Archbishop Ionafan Yeletskih (1949–)
- Yuri Yukechev (1947–)

== Z ==
- D. Zlatanov (fl. 19th c.)

== See also ==
- List of composers by name
- List of Russian composers
- Moscow Synodal Choir
- Russian liturgical music
