= Liturgy of Saint John Chrysostom (disambiguation) =

Divine Liturgy of Saint John Chrysostom or Liturgy of Saint John Chrysostom may refer to:

- Liturgy of Saint John Chrysostom, the primary worship service in the Byzantine Rite.

It may refer also to choral compositions that set the liturgical text:

- Liturgy of St. John Chrysostom (Tchaikovsky), Op. 41, composed by Pyotr Tchaikovsky in 1880.
- Divine Liturgy of St. John Chrysostom (Mokranjac), composed by Stevan Mokranjac in 1895.
- Liturgy of St. John Chrysostom (Rachmaninoff), Op. 31, composed by Sergei Rachmaninoff in 1910.
- Liturgy of St. John Chrysostom (Leontovych) musical setting composed by Mykola Leontovych in 1919.
