= Yuri Wichniakov =

Russian oktavist singer

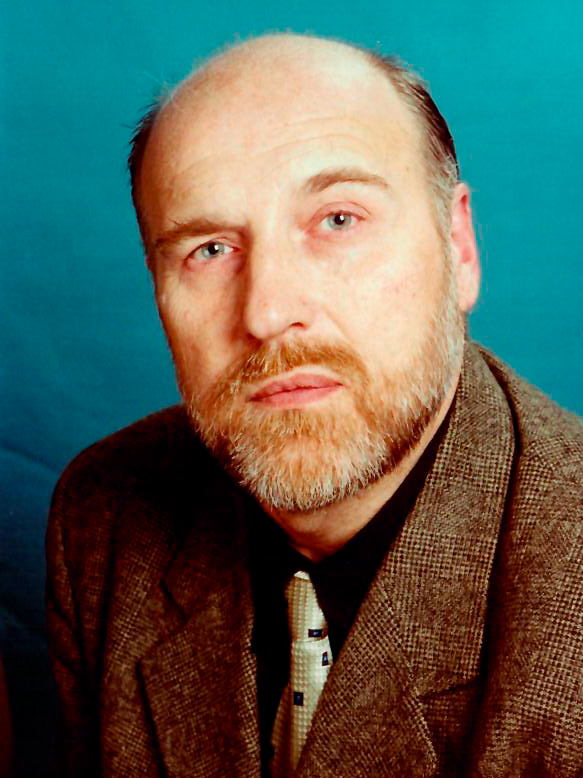
Yuri Wichniakov

Yuri Wichniakov (Russian: Юрий Вишняков) is a Russian oktavist singer known for his powerful lower register, and resonant low notes. He is the featured bass on the CD Basso Profondo From Old Russia. Wichniakov performs notes as low as E1. Several of the choir directors he has performed with have compared the timbre of his voice to that of an organ.

Together with Vladimir Miller and the late Vladimir Pasyoukov, Wichniakov is widely regarded as one of the most prominent basso profondo singers in the world. He has chanted with Vladimir Miller in several concerts dating back to 2005, and has also performed alongside Pasyukov.

== Choirs performed with ==
Wichniakov has performed the All-Night Vigil of Rachmaninoff (Всенощное бдение) with the USSR Ministry of Culture Chamber Choir in 1986. He has performed most frequently with the Orthodox Male Singers choir, which is known worldwide for their musical repertoire which highlights the profondo singer. He has most recently performed with the St. Petersburg Chamber Choir. He was hired specifically for the difficult B♭1 required in no. 5 of the All-Night Vigil.

In December 2016 Wichniakov has performed in a recording of Rachmaninoff's All-Night Vigil with the Radio Choir of the German MDR radio station in Leipzig under the direction of the Estonian conductor Risto Joost. A live recording of this performance can be seen on the radio station's official youtube channel. The corresponding CD has been nominated for the International Classical Music Awards 2018.

== Physical appearance ==
Wichniakov is an archetypal basso profondo with an imposing presence. He is rarely seen without a thick beard, and on occasion performs in an all black cassock. His career has spanned over 30 years.

== Discography ==
Year	Title	Composer	Conductor	Choir	Label
1986	All-Night Vigil	Rachmaninoff	Valery Polyansky	Chamber Choir of the Ministry of Culture of the USSR	Melodiya/Moscow Studio Archives
1993	Liturgy of St. John Chrysostom	Rachmaninoff	Valery Polyansky	Russian State Symphony Cappella Choir	Claves
1999	Basso Profondo From Old Russia	Goncharov, Lvov, Chesnokov, Grechaninov et.al.	Georgy Smirnov	The Orthodox Singers Male Choir	Russian Season
2005	Orthodox Christmas 2005 in Latvia	Chesnokov, Rachmaninoff, Vasily Zinov, Sergey Trubachov, Boris Dodonov, Georgy Smirnoff et al.	Georgy Smirnoff	The Orthodox Singers Male Choir	
2017	All-Night Vigil - Vespers by Sergei Rachmaninoff	Rachmaninoff	Risto Joost	MDR Rundfunkchor	Genuin

== See also ==
- Basso profondo
- Russian Orthodox chant
