= Musical instruments in church services =

The use of musical instruments in church services has often been seen as an innovation in church worship. This was the case in both Catholic liturgy and in the Puritan tradition. In the Catholic liturgy the Gregorian chant was for a thousand years the predominant musical form. In the Puritan tradition, there was traditionally a use of unaccompanied Psalms.

Many Oriental Orthodox Churches, such as the Coptic Orthodox Church, eschew the use of musical instruments in church services.

Conservative Anabaptist denominations, such as the Dunkard Brethren Church, teach:

Instrumental music and accompaniment will not be used in the house of God. In keeping with our Anabaptist tradition and the apparent New Testament pattern of worship, we encourage the use and development of acapella singing in our congregational worship. (Eph. 5:19; 1 Cor. 14:15; Col. 3:16.)

Some Holiness Churches of the Methodist tradition, such as the Free Methodist Church, opposed the use of musical instruments in church worship until the mid-20th century. The Free Methodist Church allowed for local church decision on the use of either an organ or piano in the 1943 Conference before lifting the ban entirely in 1955. The Reformed Free Methodist Church and Evangelical Wesleyan Church were formed as a result of a schism with the Free Methodist Church, with the former retaining a cappella worship and the latter retaining the rule limiting the number of instruments in the church to the piano and organ.

== History ==
The polyphony of Christian (predominantly Catholic) a cappella music began to develop in Europe around the 9th century AD with the practice of organum, reaching its height between the 14th and 16th centuries with compositions by composers of the Franco-Flemish school (such as Guillaume Du Fay, Johannes Ockeghem, and Josquin des Prez). The early a cappella polyphonies were sometimes doubled with other instruments, which were often wind or string instruments, or organs. By the 16th century, a cappella polyphony had further developed, but gradually, the cantata began to take the place of a cappella forms. Sixteenth-century a cappella polyphony, nonetheless, continued to influence church composers throughout this period and to the present day. Recent evidence has shown that some of the early pieces by Palestrina, such as those written for the Sistine Chapel, were intended to be accompanied by an organ "doubling" for some or all of the voices.

Other composers that utilized the a cappella style, if only for the occasional piece, were Claudio Monteverdi and his Lagrime d'amante al sepolcro dell'amata (A lover's tears at his beloved's grave), composed in 1610, and Andrea Gabrieli when upon his death many choral pieces were discovered, one of which was in the unaccompanied style. Learning from the preceding two composers, Heinrich Schütz utilized the a cappella style in numerous pieces; chief among these were the pieces in the oratorio style, which were traditionally performed during the Easter week and dealt with the religious subject matter of that week, such as the Passion. Five of Schutz's Historien were Easter pieces, and of these the latter three, which dealt with the passion from three different viewpoints, those of Matthew, Luke and John, were all done a cappella style. The parts of the crowd were sung while the solo parts which were the quoted parts from either Christ or the authors were performed in a plainchant.

In the Byzantine Rite of the Eastern Orthodox Church, Eastern Lutheran Churches and the Eastern Catholic Churches, the music performed in the liturgies is exclusively sung without instrumental accompaniment. Early Russian musika which started appearing in the late 17th century, in what was known as khorovïye kontsertï (choral concertos) made a cappella adaptations of Venetian-styled pieces, such as the treatise, Grammatika musikiyskaya (1675), by Nikolai Diletsky. Divine Liturgies and Western Rite Masses composed by famous composers such as Peter Tchaikovsky, Sergei Rachmaninoff, Alexander Arkhangelsky, and Mykola Leontovych are examples.

Instruments have divided Christendom since their introduction into worship. They were considered a Roman Catholic innovation, not widely practiced until the 18th century, and were opposed vigorously in worship by a number of Protestant Reformers, including Martin Luther, Ulrich Zwingli, John Calvin, and John Wesley. Opponents of musical instruments in the Christian worship believe that such opposition is supported by the Christian scriptures and Church history. There is no reference to instrumental music in early church worship in the New Testament, or in the worship of churches for the first six centuries. Several reasons have been posited throughout church history for the absence of instrumental music in church worship. (Note: The absence of instrumental music is rooted in various hermeneutic principles (ways of interpreting the Bible) which determine what is appropriate for worship. Among such principles are the regulative principle of worship (Ulrich Zwingli), Sola scriptura (Martin Luther and Ulrich Zwingli), and the history of hymn.)

Those who do not adhere to the regulative principle of interpreting Christian scripture, believe that limiting praise to the unaccompanied chant of the early church is not commanded in scripture, and that churches in any age are free to offer their songs with or without musical instruments. Those who subscribe to this interpretation believe that since the Christian scriptures never counter instrumental language with any negative judgment on instruments, opposition to instruments instead comes from an interpretation of history. There is no written opposition to musical instruments in any setting in the first century and a half of Christian churches (33–180 AD). The use of instruments for Christian worship during this period is also undocumented. Toward the end of the 2nd century, Christians began condemning the instruments themselves. Those who oppose instruments today believe these Church Fathers had a better understanding of God's desire for the church, but there are significant differences between the teachings of these Church Fathers and Christian opposition to instruments today. Modern Christians typically believe it is acceptable to play instruments or to attend weddings, funerals, banquets, etc., where instruments are heard playing religious music. The Church Fathers made no exceptions. Since the New Testament never condemns instruments themselves, much less in any of these settings, author Everett Ferguson wrote that "the church Fathers go beyond the New Testament in pronouncing a negative judgment on musical instruments." Written opposition to instruments in worship began near the turn of the 5th century.

Since "a cappella" singing brought a new polyphony (more than one note at a time) with instrumental accompaniment, it is not surprising that Protestant reformers who opposed the instruments (such as Calvin and Zwingli) also opposed the polyphony. While Zwingli was destroying organs in Switzerland – Luther called him a fanatic – the Church of England was burning books of polyphony.

Some Holiness Churches such as the Free Methodist Church opposed the use of musical instruments in church worship until the mid-20th century. The Free Methodist Church allowed for local church decision on the use of either an organ or piano in the 1943 Conference before lifting the ban entirely in 1955. The Reformed Free Methodist Church and Evangelical Wesleyan Church were formed as a result of a schism with the Free Methodist Church, with the former retaining a cappella worship and the latter retaining the rule limiting the number of instruments in the church to the piano and organ. Present-day Christian religious bodies known for conducting their worship services without musical accompaniment include many Oriental Orthodox Churches (such as the Coptic Orthodox Church), many Anabaptist communities (including Old Order Anabaptist groups—such as the Amish, Old German Baptist Brethren, Old Order Mennonites, as well as Conservative Anabaptist groups—such as the Dunkard Brethren Church and Conservative Mennonites), some Presbyterian churches devoted to the regulative principle of worship, Old Regular Baptists, Primitive Baptists, Plymouth Brethren, Churches of Christ, Church of God, the Reformed Free Methodists, Doukhobors, and the Byzantine Rite of Eastern Christianity. Certain high church services and other musical events in liturgical churches (such as the Roman Catholic Mass and the Lutheran Divine Service) may be a cappella, a practice remaining from apostolic times. Many Mennonites also conduct some or all of their services without instruments. Sacred Harp, a type of folk music, is an a cappella style of religious singing with shape notes, usually sung at singing conventions.

== See also ==
- A cappella § Christian
- Regulative principle of worship

== Sources ==
- Bales, James D. (1973). Instrumental Music and New Testament Worship. Searcy, AR: Truth for Today World Mision School. ASIN B0006CBMTU.
- Calvin, John (2009) [16th century]. "Psalms 33:2". Calvin's Commentaries. Vol. 8. Eerdmans. ISBN 978-0801013317.
- Clarke, Adam (1844). The New Testament of Our Lord and Saviour Jesus Christ, the Text Carefully Printed From the Most Correct Copies of the Present Authorized Version Including the Marginal Readings and Parallel Texts with a Commentary and Critical Notes With a Commentary and Critical Notes Designed As a Help to a Better Understanding of the Sacred Writings (Clarke's Commentary). Vol. VI. Nashville, TN: Abingdon Press, n.d.
- Ferguson, Everett (1972). A Cappella Music in the Public Worship of the Church. The Way of Life Series. Abilene, TX: Biblical Research Press. ASIN B001D08SDM.
- Hoiberg, Dale H., ed. (2010). "A Cappella". Encyclopædia Britannica. Vol. I: A–Ak – Bayes (15th ed.). Chicago: Encyclopædia Britannica, Inc. ISBN 978-1-59339-837-8.
- Kurfees, Marshall C. (1911). Instrumental music in the worship or the Greek verb psallo philologically and historically examined together with a full discussion of kindred matters relating to music in Christian worship. Nashville: McQuiddy Print Co. ASIN B00088QFHQ.
- M'Clintock, John; Strong, James, eds. (1894). "Music". Cyclopaedia of Biblical, Theological, and Ecclesiastical Literature. Vol. VI: Me-Nev. New York, NY: Harper and Brothers Publishers.
- McKinnon, James William (1965). The Church Fathers and Musical Instruments. Columbia University Dissertations. Columbia University. ASIN B001F2LQJ6.
- McKinnon, James (1998). The Temple, the Church Fathers, and Early Western Chant. Aldershot: Ashgate Publishing Limited. ISBN 978-0860786887.
- McKinnon, James (1989) [1987]. Music in Early Christian Literature. Cambridge: Cambridge University Press. ISBN 0-521-37624-6.
- Taruskin, Richard (2005). The Oxford History of Western Music. Vol. 1. New York: Oxford University Press. ISBN 0-19-522270-9.
- Taruskin, Richard (2005a). The Oxford History of Western Music. Vol. 2. New York: Oxford University Press. ISBN 0-19-522271-7.
- Taruskin, Richard (2005b). The Oxford History of Western Music. Vol. 3. New York: Oxford University Press. ISBN 0-19-522272-5.
- Ware, Timothy (1997). The Orthodox Church: New Edition (2nd ed.). London: Penguin Books. ISBN 978-0140146561.
- Weiss, Piero; Taruskin, Richard (1984). Music in the Western World. New York: Shirmer Books. ISBN 978-0028729008.
