= Liturgy of Saint John Chrysostom =

Eucharistic liturgy of the Byzantine Rite

The Liturgy of Saint John Chrysostom is the most celebrated divine liturgy in the Byzantine Rite. It is named after its core part, the anaphora attributed to Saint John Chrysostom, Archbishop of Constantinople in the 5th century.

== History ==
The Liturgy reflects the work of the Cappadocian Fathers to both combat heresy and define Trinitarian theology for the Christian Church. This liturgy was probably used originally by the School of Antioch (John having been a deacon and priest in Antioch) and, therefore, most likely developed from West Syriac liturgical rites. In Constantinople, it was refined and beautified under John's guidance as Archbishop (AD 398–404 ). As a divine liturgy of the Church of Holy Wisdom, Hagia Sophia, it became over time the usual divine liturgy in the churches within the Byzantine Empire. Just two divine liturgies (aside from the presanctified), those of Saints John and Basil the Great, became the norm in the Byzantine Church by the end of the reign of Justinian I. After the Quinisext Council and the liturgical reforms of Patriarch Theodore Balsamon, the Byzantine Rite became the only rite in the Eastern Orthodox Church, remaining so until the 19th- and 20th-century reintroduction by certain jurisdictions of Western Rites.

The liturgy of Chrysostom was translated into Latin by Leo Tuscus in the 1170s.

== Structure ==
External videos
- The Orthodox Divine Liturgy in Greek on YouTube

=== Prothesis (Preparation) ===
The clergy prepare the bread and wine for the Eucharist at the Table of Oblation (Prothesis). This includes:

- The Proskomedia, where the priest cuts the Lamb (bread) and places it on the paten.
- Commemoration of the living and the dead.
- Covering of the Gifts and prayers for their sanctification.

=== Liturgy of the Catechumens ===
This portion includes prayers, hymns, and scripture readings, preparing the faithful for the Eucharist.

- Opening Blessing - "Blessed is the Kingdom..."
- Great Litany - A series of petitions for peace, salvation, and the Church.
- Antiphons - Psalms sung in response to petitions.
- Little Entrance - A procession with the Gospel Book.
- Trisagion Hymn - "Holy God, Holy Mighty, Holy Immortal..."
- Epistle Reading - A reading from the New Testament letters.
- Gospel Reading - A reading from the Gospels.
- Homily - A sermon, often given by the priest or bishop.

=== Liturgy of the Faithful ===
The core of the Divine Liturgy, where the Eucharist is consecrated and received.

- Cherubic Hymn - Sung as the Gifts are solemnly transferred to the altar.
- Great Entrance - The clergy process with the bread and wine.
- Litany of Supplication* - Prayers for the Church and faithful.
- Creed - Recitation of the Nicene Creed.
- Anaphora - The Eucharistic prayer, including:
- Preface - Thanksgiving to God.
  - Sanctus - "Holy, Holy, Holy..."
  - Words of Institution - Recalling the Last Supper.
  - Epiclesis - Invocation of the Holy Spirit to sanctify the Gifts.
  - Intercessions - Prayers for the Church, saints, and departed.

=== Eucharist and Conclusion ===
- Lord’s Prayer - Recitation of the Our Father.
- Elevation of the Holy Gifts - "Holy things for the holy!"
- Communion - The clergy and faithful receive the Eucharist.
- Post-Communion Prayers* - Thanksgiving prayers.
- Dismissal - Blessing and final prayers, concluding with "Let us depart in peace."

== Modern classical musical compositions ==
Besides numerous traditional chants of several schools, the following classical compositions by famous composers include:

- Liturgy of St. John Chrysostom (Stanković), a choral work composed by Kornelije Stanković in 1862.
- Liturgy of St. John Chrysostom (Tchaikovsky), op. 41, a choral work composed by Pyotr Tchaikovsky in 1880.
- Liturgy of St. John Chrysostom (Rimsky-Korsakov), op. 22, a choral work composed by Nikolay Rimsky-Korsakov in 1883.
- Liturgy of St. John Chrysostom (Marinković), a choral work composed by Josif Marinković in 1889.
- Divine Liturgy of St. John Chrysostom (Mokranjac), a choral work composed by Stevan Mokranjac in 1895.
- Liturgy of St. John Chrysostom (Grechaninov), a choral work composed by Alexander Grechaninov in 1897.
- Liturgy of St. John Chrysostom (Badev), a choral work composed by Atanas Badev, published in 1898.
- Liturgy of St. John Chrysostom (Ippolotov-Ivanov), a choral work composed by Mikhail Ippolitov-Ivanov in 1903.
- Liturgy of St. John Chrysostom (Kastalsky), a choral work composed by Alexander Kastalsky in 1905.
- Liturgy of St. John Chrysostom (Boksay), a choral work composed by János Boksay in 1906.
- Liturgy of St. John Chrysostom (Paliashvili), a choral work composed by Zakaria Paliashvili in 1909.
- Liturgy of St. John Chrysostom (Rachmaninoff), op. 31, a choral work composed by Sergei Rachmaninoff in 1910.
- Liturgy of St. John Chrysostom (Shvedov), a choral work composed by Konstantin Shvedov in 1911.
- Liturgy of St. John Chrysostom (Chesnokov), a choral work composed by Pavel Chesnokov in 1914.
- Liturgy of St. John Chrysostom (Leontovych), musical setting composed by Mykola Leontovych in 1919.
- Liturgy of St. John Chrysostom (Dinev), a choral work composed by Petar Dinev in 1926.
- Liturgy of St. John Chrysostom (Hristov), a choral work composed by Dobri Hristov in 1934.
- Liturgy of St. John Chrysostom (Tarakanov), a choral work composed by Valeri Tarakanov.
- Liturgy of St. John Chrysostom (Levine), a choral work composed by Alexander Levine in 2006.
- Liturgy of St. John Chrysostom (Alfeyev), composed by Hilarion Alfeyev in 2009.
- The Liturgy of Saint John Chrysostom (Kurt Sander) composed in 2016 using English-language setting; professionally recorded by The PaTRAM Institute Singers, Peter Jermihov-conductor and Soundmirror-Blanton Alspaugh, producer (08/2017); world-premiere performance in Howell, New Jersey (09/20/2017); published by Musica Russica (2019); released by Reference Recordings (04/2019); nominated for Grammy Award for Best Choral Performance (nominations-11/2019; award ceremony-01/2020).
- Liturgy of St. John Chrysostom (Sheehan), a choral work composed by Rowan Benedict Sheehan in 2018. Recorded for commercial release by St. Tikhon's Choir, Rowan Benedict Sheehan, conductor and Soundmirror, Blanton Alspaugh.

Other modern compositions of The Liturgy of Saint John Chrysostom include those by Mykola Dyletsky, Maksym Berezovsky, Dimitry Bortniansky, Artemy Vedel, Yevhen Stankovych (2003), Myroslav Skoryk (2005), Roman Hurko (2000, 2003, 2011), Fr. John Sembrat (2015).

== See also ==
- Anaphora (liturgy)
- Liturgy of Saint Basil
- Liturgy of Saint James
