= The Male Choir of St. Petersburg =

The Male Choir of St Petersburg is a Russian choir that moved to the City of St Petersburg in the 18th century from Moscow. At the end of the 19th century, the choir numbered 90: 40 adults and 50 boys (women were not admitted). Of the 22 basses, 7 were bassi profondi, most notably Vladimir Pasyoukov and Vladimir Miller, who were capable of reaching bottom G easily.

== Discography ==
The Male Choir Of St. Petersburg - Vadim Afanasiev (EMI Classics)

== See also ==
- Vladimir Pasyoukov
- Vladimir Miller
- Oktavist
- Russian Orthodox chant
