= Savvas Karantzias =

Greek composer

- Σάββας Καραντζιάς
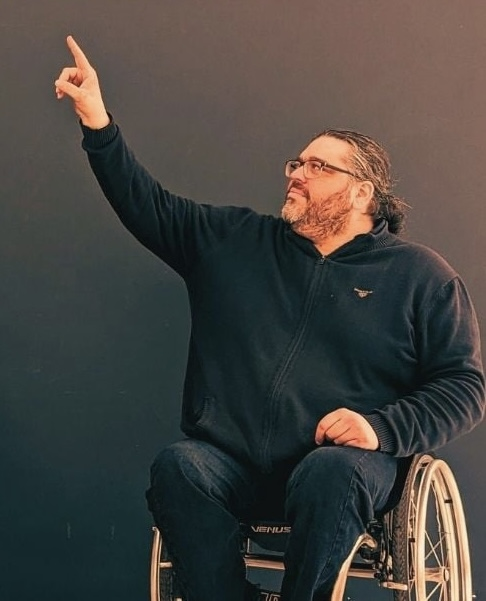
- Karantzias in 2024
- Born: 19 March 1981 (age 45); Rhodes, Greece
- Education: Arcangelo Corelli Conservatory
- Notable work: "Theophanes the Greek", "Andrei Rublev", "Katharsis"
- Style: Minimalistic
- Website: https://savvaskarantzias.com

Savvas Karantzias (Greek: Σάββας Καραντζιάς; born 19 March 1981) is a Greek composer, conservatory director, and co-founder of the Festival European Polyphony.

== Biography ==
Karantzias was born in Rhodes, Greece. He received his first influences alongside his mother, Anthoula Misodoulaki, a piano teacher and founder of the A. Corelli Conservatory. He began his studies in classical guitar with teacher Paraskevi Malamati at the A. Corelli Conservatory in 1995; from 1991 to 1996, he attended vocal lessons at the A. Corelli Conservatory in the class of Nikolaos Petrides, participating in various musical events throughout Greece. Karantzias, in his early years as a composer, drew inspiration from and experimented with the works and styles of Arvo Pärt and Giya Kancheli. He made extensive use of minimalist techniques as well, but never became attached to any particular method. He studied composition with Nikos Harizanos and he started to become known outside Greece in 2018 when he presented the work "Theophanes the Greek" in the Ecumenical Patriarchate of Constantinople upon the invitation of the Ecumenical Patriarch Bartholomew of Constantinople.

Later, in 2019, Karantzias co-founded the "European Polyphony / Polyphonie Europeenne"; created in collaboration with Arts Spontanés, based in Paris, and Ars Artis, based in Rhodes, it focuses on music and its influence on the arts. The festival, which made its debut in 2019 in Rhodes, Greece, expanded its reach in 2023 with an edition held in Paris, France. In addition, he is the founder of the Ars Artis Organization, which promotes artistic initiatives in various fields. He is a contemporary composer and the director of the A. Corelli Conservatory, located in Rhodes, Greece, where he also serves as a professor; since June 2014, he has been a diploma holder in classical guitar. He is known for his innovative approach to music education and his research in the synthetic study of sound phenomena and the representation of visual imagery through sound.

== Career ==
Savvas Karantzias made his recording debut in 2015 with the album "Echomonologues," released in collaboration with Subways Music Company. His extensive body of work includes a diverse range of compositions for orchestra, choir, theater, chamber music, and solo instruments.

In 2016, he composed the music-theatrical play "O kiklos tou 10" (The Circle of 10), which premiered at the Michael Cacoyannis Foundation and featured collaborations with distinguished actors, directors, and choreographers.

One of his notable works includes the oratorio "Theophanes the Greek" composed in 2017, which honors the founder of Russian iconography. The piece was first performed at the Cathedral Church of the Annunciation in Rhodes and subsequently in Istanbul, Paris, Moscow, and Alexandria under the auspices of the Patriarchate of Alexandria, where he received the honor of Grand Commander of Our Lion Battalion of Alexandria.

Savvas Karantzias's compositions have gained international recognition, being performed by prominent artists and ensembles globally. In 2018, he began a long-term collaboration with the Moscow Synodal Choir, providing new works annually for their performances.

In 2020, he completed the oratorio "Andrei Rublev," which premiered at the Zaryadye Concert Hall in Moscow. His works have since been published through the intellectual rights company Musicentry and the Dutch publishing house Donemus.

In 2022, he launched the project "The Sound of the Saints," which premiered at Symphony Space in New York. That year also marked the start of his collaboration with the Archdiocesan Cathedral Choir and Orchestra.

Most recently, in 2023, Savvas Karantzias composed the work "Katharsis," performed by the award-winning Estonian Philharmonic Chamber Choir under the direction of Tõnu Kaljuste. The piece debuted in Rhodes and is dedicated to renowned composers, Arvo Pärt, Veljo Tormis, the Estonian Philharmonic Chamber Choir and Tõnu Kaljuste.

== Works ==
The following is a list of works by Savvas Karantzias.

Orchestra with instrumental soloists

- Theophanes the Greek: for Mixed Choir, Soprano, Piano, Percussions, String Orchestra, Narrator (2018)
- Andrei Rublev: for Mixed Choir, Soprano, Tenoro, Piano, Percussions, String Orchestra, Narrator (2020)

Other Orchestra Works

- The circle of 10: for Music live Performance, Solo Soprano, Piano, Orchestra (2015)
- I was sleeping under a jasmine tree: for Tape, String Orchestra and Percussions (2020)

Chamber Music

- Agripnia: for Solo Piano and Narration (2018)
- Re-born: for 2 Pianos (2018)
- In memory of Giya: Homage to Giya Kancheli for violin, viola and cello (2020)
- Inspiration: for Violin and Countertenor
- Touch: for Violin, Percussion, Narrator and Solo Soprano
- The Violinist: for Tape and Violin improvisations
- Sisyphus: for Tape and Violin improvisations

Solo instrumental

- Four errant icons: for Solo Guitar (2013)
- Prelude: Nostalgic Bells: for Solo Piano (2014)
- Metavasis: for Solo Piano (2017)
- The circle of nine: for Solo Violin (2017)

Choral

- Sanctus for Mass: for Double Choir (2015)
- Theophanes the Greek: 2nd version for Piano, Percussions, Children's Choir and Mixed Choir (2019)
- Katharsis: for a cappella choir, Violin and Percussion
