= Alexander Nikolsky (composer) =

Russian composer

Alexander Vasilievich Nikolsky
- Александр Васильевич Никольский
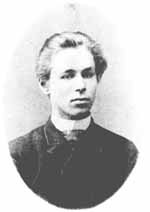
- Alexander Nikolsky
- Born: 1874; Vladykino, Penza Governorate, Russian Empire
- Died: 1943 (aged 68–69); Moscow, Russian SFSR, Soviet Union
- Education: Moscow Conservatory
- Occupations: Composer, choir conductor, educator

Alexander Vasilievich Nikolsky (Russian: Александр Васильевич Никольский, scientific transliteration: Aleksandr Vasil'evič Nikol'skij; 1874–1943) was a Russian composer, choir conductor, and educator.

== Biography ==
Nikolsky initially received clerical training to become a priest, graduating from the Moscow Synodal School in 1896. He continued his musical education the following year at the Moscow Conservatory. After the October Revolution, he was active in the Proletkult as an author of proletarian songs and was also engaged in ethnographic work.

In 1928, he became a teacher in the choral department of the Moscow Conservatory, where he worked until his death (from 1935 as a professor). Nikolsky played a prominent role in the development of choral art in Russia and composed many sacred works. In his secular choral compositions, he set texts by A. Pushkin, H. Heine (translations by P. Bykov, M. Mikhailov, P. Weinberg, N. Berg, M. Prakhov), M. Rosenheim, A. Koltonovsky, K. Balmont, N. Schreiter, M. Lermontov, A. Koltsov, and S. Gorodetsky.

These works were recently included in the Anthology of Russian Secular A Cappella Choral Music of the 19th to Early 20th Century (Антология русской светской хоровой музыки a cappella XIX — начала XX века / Antologija russkoj svetskoj chorovoj muzyki a cappella XIX — načala XX veka) (Vol. 16).

On the occasion of his 135th birthday, the student choir of the Moscow Conservatory under Stanislav Kalinin dedicated a memorial concert to him.

Nikolsky was buried at Moscow’s Pyatnitskoye Cemetery.

In recent years, Lyudmila Viktorovna Malazai has been conducting research on Nikolsky’s life and works.

== Selected works ==
See also Free scores by Alexander Vasilievich Nikolsky at the International Music Score Library Project (IMSLP).

- All-Night Vigil, Op. 26 audio samples
- From My Youth, Op. 51
- Liturgy of St. John Chrysostom, Op. 31 audio samples
- Minuet in A major, Op. 43 No. 3
- 4 Pieces for Piano and Winds, Op. 40
- 2 Pieces for String Trio, Op. 42
- Praise Ye the Name of the Lord
- 4 Russian Songs, Op. 27
- Psalm 22 “My God, my God, why hast Thou forsaken me” – audio sample
- Psalm 27 “The Lord is My Light” – audio sample

== See also ==
- Anthology of Russian Secular A Cappella Choral Music of the 19th to Early 20th Century (in German)
- List of composers of Russian sacred music
