= Vladimir Miller =

Russian opera singer (born 1964)

Vladimir Robertovich Miller (Russian: Влади́мир Робертович Ми́ллер; born February 3, 1964) is a Russian opera, folk and choir singer possessing a low-ranging basso profondo (oktavist) voice, one of the lowest voices in the world. Many have also lauded the powerful unique timbre of his voice, especially when singing low notes. Miller is regularly heard singing the F1 and G1. He was born in Siberia.

== Biography ==
Miller was not initially planning a singing career. He graduated from Leningrad State Conservatoire as a musicologist. Later he studied singing at Cologne Music School in Germany. His teachers were Reinhard Leisenheimer and Kurt Moll. He soon became a leading soloist in the St. Petersburg State Academic Capella.

Miller has performed in concerts in Great Britain, Germany, the Vatican, the Netherlands, Italy, and the United States. Miller has learned and performed an extensive repertoire, singing leading parts in operas by Mozart and Claudio Monteverdi. He sang parts in cantatas and oratorios by Heinrich Schütz, Johann Sebastian Bach, Anton Bruckner, Alexander Gretchaninov, John Tavener, and others. A discography available on Miller's official website currently lists 110 cds featuring Vladimir Miller.

Miller has sung in the Male Choir of the Valaam Institute for Choral Art since 1990. He is also performing with the Optina Pustyn Male Choir St. Petersburg, which was founded by Alexander Semyonov in 1996.

Besides his concerts Vladimir Miller focuses on the field of Russian musical history. He has published a number of works. Miller and Mikhail Kruglov, are great friends and they often sing together. He has also sung with fellow oktavists Yuri Wichniakov, the late Vladimir Pasyoukov and the late Yuri Emashev.

== See also ==
- Basso profondo
- Russian Orthodox chant

== Sources ==
- Nikitin, K., (translation by Irinia Simonchik) Chants of the Russian Orthodox Church, Male choir of the Valaam Institute for Choral Art
- The Male Choir of St. Petersburg, Biography: Vladimir Miller
