= Klara Milich =

Opera by Alexander Kastalsky

Klara Milich (Russian: Клара Милич, romanized: Klara Milich) is an opera in four acts and six scenes by the Russian composer Alexander Kastalsky based on the eponymous story by Ivan Turgenev published in 1883. The piano score of the opera was published in 1908 by Jurgenson's publishing house and premiered on November 11, 1916, at the Zimin Opera House in Moscow. The story centers around the death of the main protagonist Klara Milich, and the work is characterized as being a oneiric, or an appeal to introspection and a destabilization between psychological states of awareness and dreaming.

== Story and plot ==
Kastalsky's libretto generally follows the narrative of Turgenev's story, however deviating from Turgenev's main plot by adding several more elements than found in the original story. According to the memoirs of the composer's son, his father was attracted by "the contrast between the romantic fatal love that blossomed against the backdrop of a modest old Moscow life, well known to him, and the indifferent vulgarity of the so-called" world."

One of the differences between Kastalsky's opera and the original story is how the main character Aratov is portrayed. Turgenev's story paints him as a bored character, whereas in the opera he is a truly romantic character. In addition, Aratov does not meet Clara's relatives in the opera. However, audiences can observe Clara's last performance and her death, while Turgenev only tells of the girl's death in retelling: Aratov learns about them from his friend Kupfer. In the opera, the death scene is also drawn out, while Kastalsky also infused his texts with influences of W. A. Shakespeare's "Romeo and Juliet." Kastalsky also compresses much of Turgenev's story into the opera's fourth and final act, spending more time on the relationship between Aratov and Klara than in the story. Musicologists D.M. Ermakova and E.E. Lobzakova point out the additional influence of Tchaikovsky's opera "Eugene Onegin" in the portrayal of Aratov:

"If the idea of the concerto, scaled by Kastalsky in the opera to a whole act, was nevertheless suggested by the original source, then the scenes of mass urban festivities of the second act, broadcasting images of spring, love, flirting, easy pastime, against which Aratov utters in Onegin's restrained and a cold rebuff to Clara's passionate feelings are entirely introduced by the composer in order to achieve the necessary dramatic contrast."

Kastalsky also uses several other textual influences. The libretto includes fragments of other works by Turgenev: a stanza from the poem "Andrey" (1846), a poem "Torrents of Spring" (1843), an excerpt "Before the Hunt" from the cycle "The Village" (1846) and a prose poem "The Sphinx" (1878). One of the other differences is Kastalsky's choice to portray Klara as an operatic singer, whereas in Turgenev's version she was a dramatic actress but not an opera singer.

== Criticism ==
Vladimir Vladimirovich Derzhanovsky, 19th-century Russian music critic, praised the opera for its strong instrumentation and dramatic quality, especially Klara's death and the "interesting details." He especially loved the romances, "...in the finished, expressive and laconic music of which the image of the unfortunate, insane Clara was embodied."
