= Mikhail Kruglov =

Russian opera singer

Mikhail Kruglov (Russian: Михаил Круглов) is a Russian opera, folk and choir singer possessing a strong low-ranging oktavist voice. Kruglov was born in Siberia in 1972.

== Biography ==
The artist has an active concert career.

== Sources ==
- "Mikhail Kruglov". Mieazynarodowy Festiwal.
- "Showing posts sorted by relevance for query Mikhail Kruglov". The Basso Profondo Blog.

== See also ==
- Oktavist
- Basso Profondo
- Russian Orthodox chant
