= Dmitry Vasilievich Allemanov =

Russian composer

Dmitry Vasilyevich Allemanov
- Дмитрий Васильевич Аллеманов
- Born: 1867; Buzuluk, Russia
- Died: 1928; Moscow, Russia
- Occupation(s): Composer, Teacher, Archpriest
- Notable work: "Course on the History of Russian Church Singing,"; “Modern Notation of the Greek Church" [co-author]

Dmitry Vasilievich Allemanov (Russian: Дмитрий Васильевич Аллеманов, born in Buzuluk, 1867- Moscow, 1928) was a Russian sacred music composer, music teacher, and archpriest of the Russian Orthodox Church. During his career, he not only wrote sacred hymns and oversaw their publication but published theoretical works on church singing technique and musical notation. His total compositional oeuvre is said to total at 93 works.

Allemanov studied and eventually graduated from The Samara Theological Seminary_{[rus]} and went on to become a psalmist in Iletsk. However, in 1895 he had already become the regent of the Choir in the Oryol Diocese. After time he left for Moscow, however on his way earning a certificate of study from the St. Petersburg Singing Chapel and briefly did time there as a psalmist. In 1901, he would gain priesthood and begin serving in a parish in Ufa. However, he would later return to Moscow and teach in a theological seminary. Following his return, he would later begin teaching as a music teacher in the Moscow Synodal School. Because of his devotion to reviving and teaching the ancient techniques and methods of church singing, he is accredited with helping foster interest in the rediscovery of ancient styles of Russian sacred music in the Institution. In 1909, he became a member of the council of the Moscow Society of Church Singers.

In 1912, Allemanov began working on his methodology to resurrect Old Russian Church singing technique and was a supporter of their style, as it was built on domestic interpretations of Greek chants. He saw the heart of Russian chant was echoing the sounds of everyday speech intonations. Allemanov desired to popularize the 19th century style of sacred Russian music. The main elements of 19th century were, according to Russian Professor of Arts N.A. Plotnikova, "normative four-voice, the use of dissonances, chromatisms, reliance on intonation and the harmonic language of everyday chants."

Up until 1918, he served at the Church of the Praise of the Most Holy Theotokos_{[rus]} in Moscow, although in 1932 it was demolished. In the 1920s, as a result of the breakup of the Synodal School he joined The Drama Union_{[rus]} (Dramsoyuz) in order to continue composing and writing music.

== Achievements ==
During the 20th century, he was best known for his pedagogical writings on ancient singing technique, most notably the “Course on the History of Russian Church Singing”, along with the co-authored text, “Modern Notation of the Greek Church." He also esteemed for his work in transcribing Byzantine church music for usage in the Moscow Orthodox church. His music is still performed today in Orthodox services, and one of his most popular publications is "Singing at the Divine Liturgy, even in the saints of our father, John Chrysostom".
