= Atanas Badev =

Bulgarian composer and music teacher (1860 - 1908)

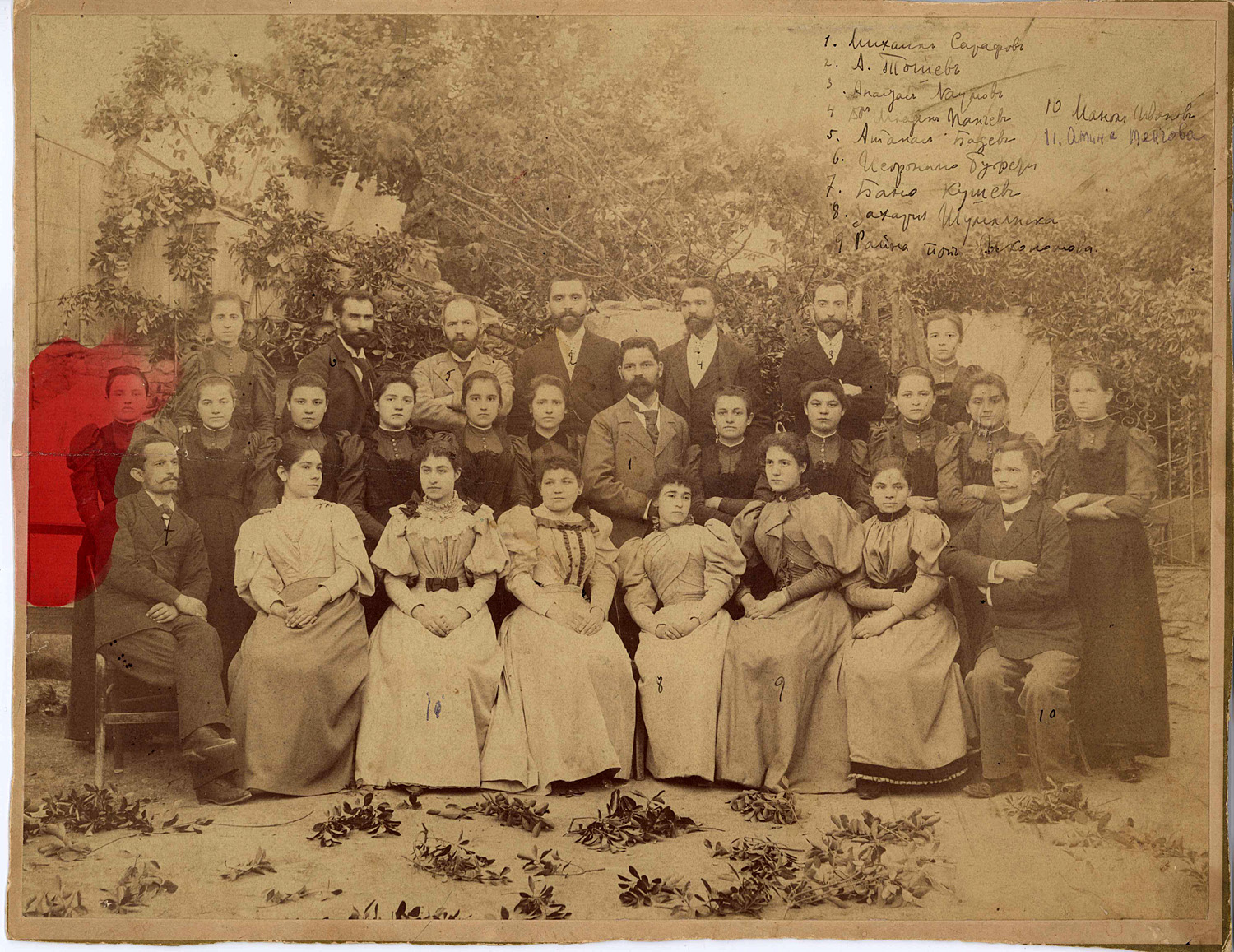
Bulgarian teachers in Thessaloniki. Badev is third from left on the top row. Badev was a teacher in both - Bulgarian Men's High School of Thessaloniki and Bulgarian Girls' High School of Thessaloniki.

Atanas Badev (Cyrillic: Атанас Бадев; January 1860 – 21 September 1908) was a Bulgarian composer and music teacher.

== Biography ==
Badev was born in Prilep, Ottoman Empire, present-day North Macedonia. His family sent him to study at the Bulgarian Men's High School of Thessaloniki, but he graduated from his secondary education in 1884 at the First Male High School of Sofia. After the Bulgarian unification of 1885, Badev denounced the actions of the Bulgarian Secret Central Revolutionary Committee as premature because he believed that Macedonia should first join Eastern Rumelia, and then think of their common unification with the Principality of Bulgaria. At the outbreak of the Serbo-Bulgarian war he became a Bulgarian army volunteer.

Initially he studied mathematics at the University of Odessa. He studied later music in Moscow and St. Petersburg and was taught by, to mention a few, the great Russian composers Balakirev and Nikolai Rimsky-Korsakov. In 1888 and 1889 for the education of Badev funds were granted from the Bulgarian government as a special grant for a young talent. Apart from his choral adaptations of folk and children's songs, Badev is also the composer of Liturgy of St. John Chrysostom (first published in Leipzig in 1898), one of the most significant works of this genre from the end of the 19th century. He taught at different Bulgarian schools. From 1890 to 1891, then, in 1896, he worked as a music teacher in Thessaloniki, in 1892 in Bitola, in 1897–1898 in Ruse, in 1899 in Samokov, and from 1901 to his death in Kyustendil. In 1904 Atanas Badev presented to the Second Congress of Music Teachers in Sofia a report on the rhythms and metrics of Bulgarian folk songs. He died in 1908 in Kyustendil, Bulgaria.

His son, Petar, died during the First World War at the Second Battle of Cobadin as a Bulgarian army officer from the 8th Infantry Regiment. Per the post-WWII Macedonian historiography he was an ethnic Macedonian.

== See also ==
- Music of North Macedonia
- Music of Bulgaria
