= Pyotr Goncharov =

Russian soldier

- Native name: Пётр Алексеевич Гончаров
- Born: 15 January 1903; Yerzovka, Saratov Governorate, Russian Empire
- Died: 31 January 1944 (aged 41) Vodyanoe, Ukrainian SSR, USSR
- Allegiance: Soviet Union
- Branch: Red Army
- Service years: 1942–1944
- Rank: Senior Sergeant
- Conflicts: World War II †
- Awards: Hero of the Soviet Union; Order of Lenin; Order of the Red Banner; Order of the Red Star

Pyotr Alekseevich Goncharyov (Russian: Пётр Алексеевич Гончаров; 15 January 1903 – 31 January 1944) was a Soviet sniper who killed over 400 Nazis during World War II, making him one of the most successful snipers in history.

== Early life ==
He was born on 15 January 1903 to a Russian peasant family in Yerzovka. After graduating from school in his home village he moved to Stalingrad, where he worked at the Red October metallurgical plant.

== World War II ==
Originally he continued working at the factory after the German invasion of the Soviet Union, but in 1942 he entered the Red Army. Although he was originally tasked with working as a cook, he soon entered direct combat. During a battle in the area of a farm he was badly wounded by an armor-piercing projectile, but surviving and fired his anti-tank rifle at the attacker. He later switched to serving as a sniper, where he quickly showed his talent in sharpshooting. Before the war he has shown a talent for sharpshooting, but never got much practice. However, on the frontlines, he racked up a high tally in a short period of time, killing 380 Nazis by 25 June 1945 when he was nominated for the title Hero of the Soviet Union, which was awarded to him on 10 January 1944. He continued to increase his tally, reaching a total number of kills in excess of 400 before he was killed in action on 31 January 1944.
