= Nikolai Bakhmetev =

Nikolai Ivanovich Bakhmetev Николай Иванович Бахметев
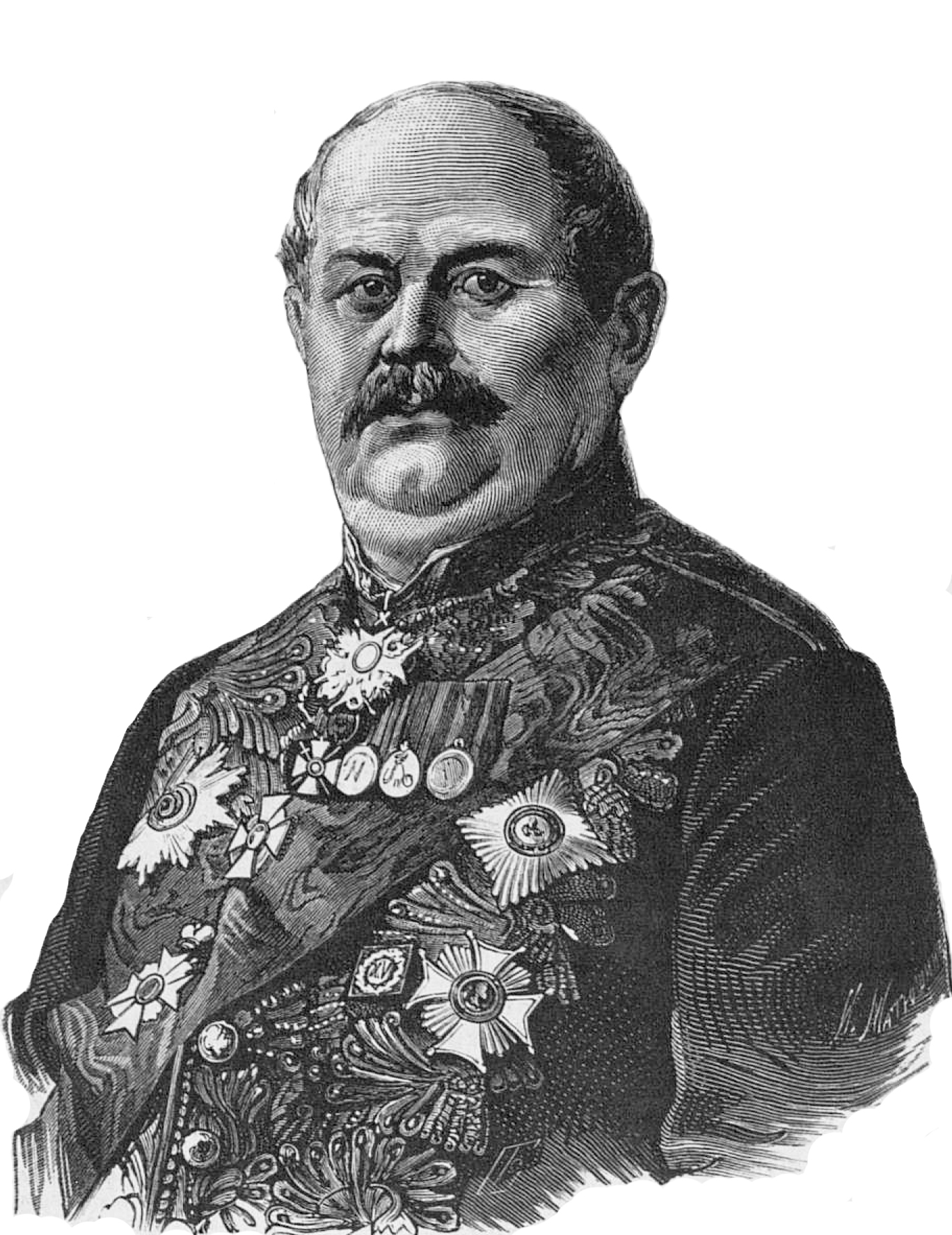

Background information
- Born: 1807; Penza, Russian Empire
- Died: 1891 (aged 83–84) Saint Petersburg, Russian Empire
- Occupations: Military, composer, violinist, director of the Imperial Court Capella
- Works: Obikhod notnovo tserkovnovo peniya (Lvov-Bakhmetev, eds.)

Nikolai Ivanovich Bakhmetev (Russian: Николай Иванович Бахметев, scientific transliteration: Nikolaj Ivanovič Bachmetev; 1807–1891) was a Russian soldier, composer, violinist and long-serving director of the Imperial Court Capella in Saint Petersburg.

== Biography ==
Bakhmetev was born in 1807 in Penza, Russian Empire. He served in the military before devoting himself to music. In 1861 he succeeded Alexei Lvov as director of the Imperial Court Capella. He remained in the position until 1883, overseeing repertoire, performance practice and the publication of official choral editions.

== Works ==
Bakhmetev edited and published the two-volume Obikhod notnovo tserkovnovo peniya (Common Book of Musical Church Singing, 1869–1879), which became the standard liturgical collection of the Imperial Court. Under his supervision, three further volumes of sacred choral compositions were issued, and his editorial revisions of traditional chants had lasting influence on Russian Orthodox church music.

== Controversy with Tchaikovsky ==
Bakhmetev is noted for a legal dispute with Pyotr Ilyich Tchaikovsky and publisher Pyotr Jurgenson. Exercising censorship privileges historically granted to the Capella by Catherine the Great and previously used by Dmitry Bortniansky, he banned the performance of Tchaikovsky’s newly published Liturgy of St. John Chrysostom during services. The prohibition was overturned in court, establishing a precedent that allowed greater freedom in publishing sacred music in the Russian Empire.

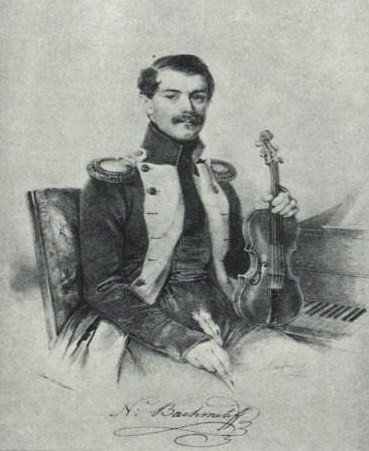
N. Bakhmetev

== Legacy ==
Lvov-Bakhmetev’s Obikhod became the most widely used “court” edition of its time and influenced later four-part choral arrangements. Iakov Tichai for example adapted it extensively for Orthodox services in Japan under St. Nicholas of Japan.

The term obikhod (обиход) literally means “standard” or “common,” and Bakhmetev’s version set the template for Russian liturgical singing in the late 19th century.

Bakhmetev died in Saint Petersburg in 1891. His editorial work remains an important part of the Russian Orthodox choral tradition, and performances of his Obikhod continue to appear in modern church repertoire.

== See also ==
- Liturgy of St. John Chrysostom (Tchaikovsky)
- List of composers of Russian sacred music

== Literature ==
- Carolyn Cairns Ritchie: The Russian Court Chapel Choir: 1796 - 1917. University of Glasgow 1994 (Ph.D. dissertation) - Appendix 11: Sacred Compositions by N. I. Bakhmetev
- John Nelson: The significance of Rimsky-Korsakov in the development of a Russian national identity. Studia Musicologica Universitatis Helsingiensis, Volumes 25, 2013 (dissertation)
- РБС/ВТ/Бахметев, Николай Иванович - RBD (in Russian)
- Vladimir Morosan: Choral Performance in Pre-revolutionary Russia. UMI Research Press, 1986 (3 The Emergence of a National Choral Style)
