= Yerzovka =

Yerzovka Ерзовка
- Urban-type settlement
- Interactive map of Yerzovka
- Location of Yerzovka Yerzovka (Volgograd Oblast)
- Coordinates: 48.9330°N 44.6377°E
- Country: Russia
- Federal subject: Volgograd Oblast
- Administrative district: Gorodishchensky District

Population (2010 Census)
  - Total: 6,128
  - Estimate (2021): 6,305 (+2.9%)
- Time zone: UTC+3 (MSK)
- Postal code: 403010
- OKTMO ID: 18605153051

Yerzovka (Russian: Ерзо́вка) is an urban locality (an urban-type settlement) in Gorodishchensky District of Volgograd Oblast, Russia. Population: 6,128 (2010 census); 5,622 (2002 census); 4,275 (1989 Soviet census).
