= Alexander Kastalsky =

Russian composer

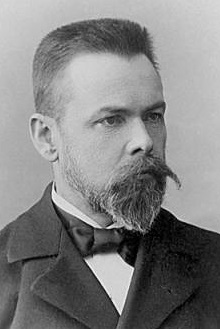
Aleksandr Kastalsky

Alexand(e)r Dmitriyevich Kastalsky (Russian: Александр Дмитриевич Кастальский) (28 November [O.S. 16 November] 1856 – 17 December 1926) was a Russian composer and folklorist.

Kastalsky was born in Moscow to protoiereus (a title roughly equivalent to archpriest) Dmitri Ivanovich Kastalsky (1820–1891). He studied music theory, composition and the piano at the Moscow Conservatory. In 1887 he started teaching piano at Moscow Synodal School, and in 1891 became assistant precentor of the Moscow Synodal Choir. He was director of both from 1910–1918 until the school was dissolved and merged with the choral faculty of the Conservatory, and the choir was forced to move from sacred to folk repertory.

He wrote his first choral works in 1896. By 1917 he had written over 130 works and established himself as an important composer of the neo-Russian style with an influence on choral composers such as Sergei Rachmaninov, Victor Kalinnikov, Alexander Grechaninov and Pavel Chesnokov.

After the 1917 Revolution, he devoted himself to the study of folksongs. This resulted in many choral works from which the most important are The Village Symphony (1923) and Rural Work in Folksongs (1924).

== Selected works ==
- Klara Milich (opera, 1916)
- Scenes of Folk Festivals in Old Russia (1913)
- Requiem for Fallen Heroes (вечная память героям) (1917)

== Pedagogical works ==
- Properties of the Russian Folk Music System ("Особенности народно-русской музыкальной системы"), 1923
- Principles of Folk Polyphony ("Основы народного многоголосия"), 1948 (ed. V.M.Belyaev)
