= Vasily Polikarpovich Titov =

Russian composer

Vasily Polikarpovich Titov (Russian: Василий Поликарпович Титов; c. 1650 – c. 1715) was a Russian composer, one of the foremost exponents of the so-called Moscow Baroque. Although Titov's works are not widely known today, he was famous during his lifetime, and his importance was acknowledged in Russia by both pre-revolutionary and Soviet musicologists.

== Biography ==
The scant biographical materials indicate that Titov was born in the 1650s. He joined Tsar Fedor's choir, the Gosudarevy Pevchie Diaki (Государевы Певчие Дьяки, The Tsar's Singers) when he was in his twenties; his salary is recorded in 1678. He quickly rose to prominence as both singer and composer. In the 1680s he collaborated with Simeon Polotsky (a famed churchman, man of letters and tutor to the children of Tsar Aleksey Mikhailovich), composing musical settings of Polotsky's psalter and an almanac of sacred poetry. In the 1680s Titov also joined Tsar Ivan's choir.

When Tsar Fedor died in 1682, Titov retained his position in Tsar Ivan's choir. Tsar Ivan died in 1696 and the choir was disbanded in 1698. It is not known precisely what happened next to Titov. He may have taken up a position as choir master in a church of the Moscow Kremlin and/or head of a music school in Moscow. Nothing is known of his last years, except that he wrote some compositions associated with the Battle of Poltava in 1709 and died soon after that.

== Style ==
Titov wrote more than 200 compositions, all of them vocal music. They include complete settings of Divine Services (Sluzhby Bozhie, Службы Божие) and a psalter (by Simeon Polotsky), as well as numerous vocal concertos for feast days. His works range from short, three-voice pieces to large-scale compositions for 12- and 24-voice choirs. Titov was one of the most important followers of Nikolay Diletsky's Idea grammatiki musikiiskoi (1679), an influential treatise on composition. Znamenny Chant was another important influence on Titov's work: he even wrote a Service setting based entirely on the chant.

In Titov's music the text is the most important element, as it defines both the overall form and the shape of the melodic lines, sometimes resulting in accomplished word-painting. The musical language is largely tonal; melodic lines are treated individually in horizontal manner, with many motivic ornaments. Titov's textures in his large-scale works suggest that these pieces were meant not to separate the choirs in alteration, but to unite them, so there is no direct connection to the antiphonal style of the Western Baroque. A characteristic feature is the so-called variantnost (вариантность), the linking of melodic motifs by continuous subtle alterations which is also an important element in Russian chant and folk polyphonic traditions.

The prayer Mnogaya leta (Многая лета), or Bol'shoe mnogoletie (Большое многолетие) proved to be the most enduring of Titov's compositions, possibly because its polyphony was more simple and therefore in line with the ideals of Classical music era. It was sung in Russian churches up to the October Revolution.

== List of works ==
- Psaltïr' rifmovannaya (Псалтырь рифмованная or Псалтырь римфотворная, 1686), a setting of Simeon Polotsky's psalter, for 3 voices
- Mesyatseslov (Месяцеслов), a setting of Simeon Polotsky's almanac of devout verses, 12 pieces for 3 voices
- Services for 8, 16 and 24 voices
- 28 sacred concertos for 12 voices
- 12 concertos for feast days (1709)
- O divnoye chudo (О дивное чудо, O Marvellous Wonder), 8 voices
- Zadostoynik (Задостойник), festal hymn
- Mnogaya leta (Многая лета), prayer with psalm, settings for 6 and 3 voices
