= Divine Liturgy of St. John Chrysostom (Mokranjac) =

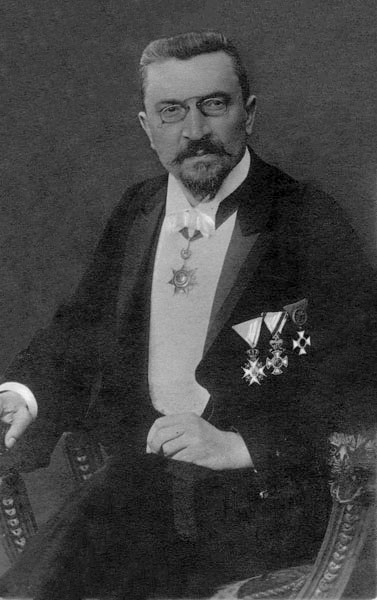
Stevan Stojanović Mokranjac

The Divine Liturgy of St. John Chrysostom (Serbian: Božanstvena Liturgija Svetog Jovana Zlatoustog) is a work by the prominent Serbian composer Stevan Stojanović Mokranjac (1856–1914), composed in 1895. It is one of the most famous and most popular compositions of the Divine Liturgy in Serbian art and is officially recognized as part of the service in the Serbian Orthodox Church.

Mokranjac intended to compose a liturgy based on motives of all eight modes of Serbian chant, but he wrote only the Liturgy after the first mode. Written after the Serbian folk chant from the end of the 18th century, it bears witness to the author's ability to form a fine entity by stylizing those tunes. His way of harmonizing them, with frequent use of chords of secondary scale degrees, resulted in an archaic though distinctly Slavonic style, and his ingenious use of polyphonic elements enhanced the expressiveness of each note of the melodic line.

== See also ==
- Liturgy of St. John Chrysostom (Tchaikovsky)
- Liturgy of St. John Chrysostom (Rachmaninoff)
- Liturgy of St. John Chrysostom (Leontovych)
