= Liturgy of St. John Chrysostom (Leontovych) =

The Liturgy of St. John Chrysostom (Ukrainian: Літургія Івана Златоустого, romanized: Liturhiya Ivana Zlatoustoho) is the musical setting of the Divine Liturgy of St. John Chrysostom by Mykola Leontovych. Consistent with Orthodox tradition, in which service is sung exclusively a cappella, the piece is set for unaccompanied choir and soloist. It was first performed in the Mykolaiv Cathedral at the Kyiv Pechersk Lavra on May 22, 1919, with Leontovych himself conducting.

== History ==
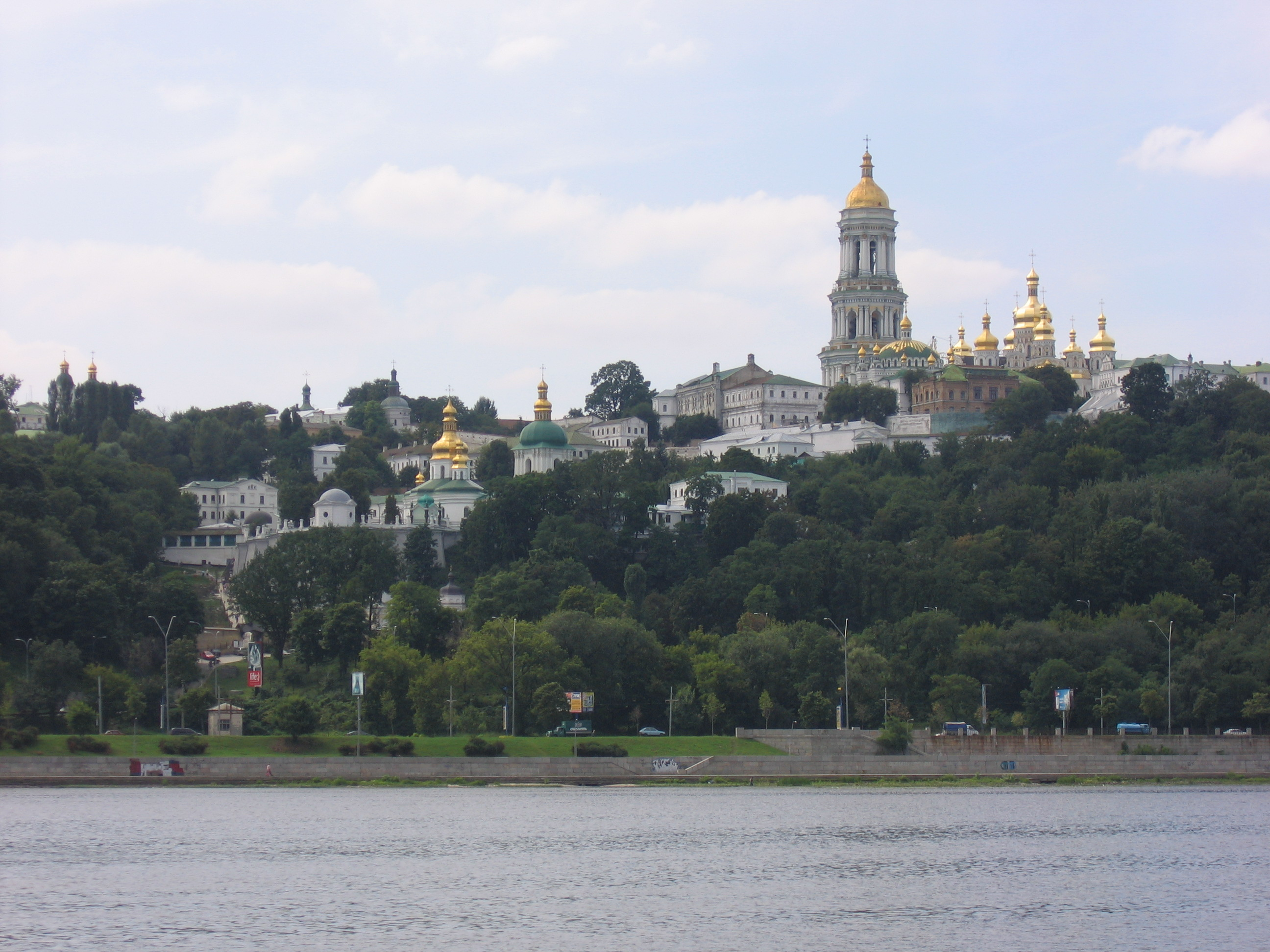
View of the Kyiv Pechersk Lavra from the Dnepr River currently. The Mykolaiv Cathedral, where the liturgy was first performed in 1919, no longer exists.

The Divine Liturgy of St. John Chrysostom is the most commonly performed liturgy in the Eastern Church. The liturgy was developed into a distinct musical genre in the eastern tradition, as the mass was in western traditions. Some composers with well-known liturgies, besides Leontovych himself, include Mykola Dyletsky, Artem Vedel, Dmytro Bortnianskiy, Maksym Berezovsky, Sergei Rachmaninoff, Pyotr Ilyich Tchaikovsky, and Pavel Chesnokov, among others.

Mykola Leontovych had a professional theological education from the theological seminary in Kamianets-Podilskiy, and spent a portion of his career as a priest. When the Ukrainian Autocephalous Orthodox Church was established and recognized in 1918, Leontovych joined in the movement. His musical output began to reflect this as he started to publish works of a religious nature such as "На воскресіння Христа" (On the Resurrection of Christ), "Хваліте ім’я Господнє" (Praise ye the name of the Lord), and "Світе тихий" (Oh quiet light).

Leontovych completed the liturgy in February 1919 and conducted the debut performance of the work on May 19 of the same year in the Mykolaiv Cathedral in the Kyiv Pechersk Lavra, (a cathedral dedicated to the founding of the first parish of the Ukrainian Autocephalous Orthodox Church). The Mykolaiv Cathedral no longer exists, having been destroyed by the Bolsheviks.

== Popularity ==
Unlike his compositions based on poetry and folk themes, which were constantly performed throughout the twentieth century, Leontovych's sacred music, and that of his predecessors, was banned in the Soviet Union. For this reason, his sacred music, including his liturgy, is not well known.

== Composition ==
"Viruryu"
A 30 second sample of "Viruryu" (Creed), which is located roughly in the middle of the piece and outlines the core beliefs of a Christian.

Composed in the early twentieth century, Leontovych's liturgy was an entirely new phenomenon in Ukrainian sacred music, in which the composer synthesized religious and folk styles. Leontovych composed in his style, essentially synthesizing a folklore foundation with the models of the liturgy used in the Lavra. He incorporated the chant native to the Lavra, preserving its intonational uniformity and adding his personal interpretation.

The piece is considered a milestone in the development of Ukrainian spiritual music. It is distinguished with its new style, which incorporated the Ukrainian language, as opposed to Church Slavonic, and Leontovych's incorporation of Ukrainian folk themes. Leontovych continued the traditions of Maksym Berezovsky and Artem Vedel, bringing a lyricism to the genre.

Nataliya Kostyuk, Ph.D. describes the piece to have a feeling of warmth and sincerity from the beginning to the end of all 24 sections of the cycle. She also notes the many forms of sound: the clear chamberness ("Bless the Lord oh my soul"), the sacral simplicity of a sermon ("In Thy kingdom", "Creed"), mystical contemplation ("Cherubic hymn"), and festive calls ("Only begotten Son", "It is worthy"). In almost all sections of the piece predominate clear, light tones and follow the manner of monastic men's singing consistent with that of a church service.

== Structure ==
The liturgy consists of the following movements:

Ukrainian

Велика єктенія
Благослови, душе моя; Мала єктенія
Єдинородний Сину; Мала єктенія
У Царстві Твоїм
Прийдіть, поклонімось
Святий Боже
Читання Апостола; Алилуя
Читання Євангелія
Потрійна єктенія
Херувимська пісня
Благальна єктенія
Отця і Сина
Вірую
Милість миру; Тобі співаємо
Достойно є
Отче наш
Єдин Свят
Хваліте Господа
Благословен
Ми бачили Світ істинний
Нехай повні будуть
Єктенія подяки
Нехай буде благословенне
Слава Отцю і Сину

English

The Great Litany
Bless the Lord, oh my soul; Short Litany
Only begotten Son; Short Litany
In Thy kingdom
Come let us worship
Oh holy God
Epistle, Alleluia
Reading of the Gospel
Trisagion: Lord, We Pray That You May Be Merciful
Cherubic Hymn
The Litany of Supplication
Father, Son and Holy Spirit
Creed
The Eucharistic Prayer: A Mercy Of Peace; We sing for Thee
Hymn to the Mother of God: It is worthy
The Lord's Prayer: Our Father
One is holy
Communion Hymn:Praise the Lord
Blessed is He who comes in the name of the Lord
We have seen the True Light
Hymn of Praise: Let our mouths be filled with praise
Litany of thanksgiving
Blessed be the name of the Lord
Glory to the Father and to the Son

== Recordings ==
- The Revival Spiritual Choir recorded an album titled Mykola Leontovych. Spiritual Works. in 2004.
- The Kyiv Chamber Choir recorded the liturgy in 2005 in an album titled Mykola Leontovych. Spiritual Works.
- The Dumka National Academic Choir of Ukraine conducted by Dr. Yevhen Savchuk recorded the liturgy with soprano E. Voroshylova, tenor K.Kleyn, baritone I.Babyuk, bass V.Hryshchuk as a soloists.

Many other groups have recorded albums about Ukrainian choral music that simply contain excerpts of the liturgy by Mykola Leontovych along with the choral music of many other composers.

== See also ==
- Liturgy of St. John Chrysostom (Tchaikovsky)
- Liturgy of St. John Chrysostom (Rachmaninoff)
- Divine Liturgy of St. John Chrysostom (Mokranjac)
