= Vladimir Pasyoukov =

Russian opera singer

Vladimir Pavlovich Pasyoukov
- Владимир Павлович Пасюков
- Born: July 29, 1944
- Died: June 20, 2011 (aged 66)
- Occupation(s): Opera, folk, and choir singer
- Spouse: Lyudmila Dvoretskaya

Vladimir Pavlovich Pasyukov (Pasjukov) (Russian:Владимир Павлович Пасюков ) (July 29, 1944 – June 20, 2011) was a Russian opera, folk and choir singer who possessed a powerful, low-ranging basso profondo (oktavist) voice. He was born in Saint Petersburg.

Pasyukov had a melodious tone for the depth of the notes he sang. His quality of singing was consistent over his range. Notably he had a dark distinct velvety timbre. His voice gave profound power to the higher overtones sung by the rest of the choir. Pasyukov retired a few years before his death on June 20, 2011. He was lauded by many as among the finest oktavist singers in history.

== Career ==
=== Singing ===
In the 1980s, Pasyukov worked in the Leningrad Academic Glinka Capella, then sang mainly with the Saint Petersburg Chamber Choir followed by The Male Choir of St. Petersburg. He also sang in the choir of the Kazan Cathedral, Saint Petersburg. Pasyukov also collaborated with other choirs, such as the Male Choir of Valaam.

=== Woodcarving ===
Pasyukov worked as a woodcarver, and his work includes being a part of the restoration of Catherine Palace in Pushkin, and a number of churches in Ukraine.

=== Awards ===
Pasyukov was awarded the Medal "For Distinguished Labour", a medal given to workers for high performances in labour or contributions in the fields of science, culture or the manufacturing industry.

== See also ==
- Basso Profondo
- Russian Orthodox chant
