= Moscow Synodal School =

The Moscow Synodal School (Russian: Синодальное училище церковного пения) and the associated Moscow Synodal Choir were the main centre of teaching for Russian Orthodox Church music in Russia prior to dissolution and merger with the choral faculty of Moscow Conservatory in 1919.

The school originally was directly linked with the Moscow Patriarchate but underwent a major reform in 1886. Important directors and faculty members of school include Alexander Kastalsky piano and director 1910-1918, Arseny Koreshchenko, counterpoint, and Viktor Kalinnikov.
