= Liturgy of St. John Chrysostom (Tchaikovsky) =

1878 choral work by Pyotr Ilyich Tchaikovsky

- by Pyotr Ilyich Tchaikovsky
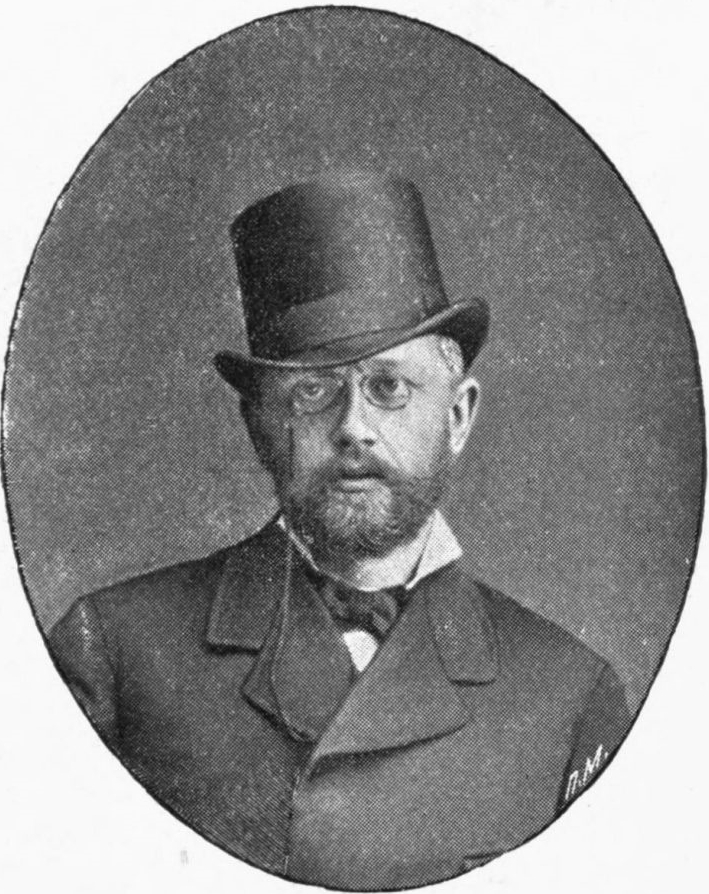
- Tchaikovsky c. 1877
- Native name: Литургия святого Иоанна Златоуста
- Opus: 41
- Form: Setting of the Divine Liturgy
- Language: Church Slavonic
- Composed: 1878
- Movements: 15
- Vocal: SATB choir

The Liturgy of St. John Chrysostom (Russian: Литургия святого Иоанна Златоуста, Liturgiya svyatogo Ioanna Zlatousta) is an a cappella choral composition by Pyotr Ilyich Tchaikovsky, his Op. 41, composed in 1878. It consists of settings of texts taken from the Divine Liturgy of St. John Chrysostom, the most celebrated of the eucharistic services of the Eastern Orthodox Church. Tchaikovsky's setting constitutes the first "unified musical cycle" of the liturgy.

== Background ==
Tchaikovsky, known primarily for his symphonies, concertos and ballets, was deeply interested in the music and liturgy of the Russian Orthodox Church. In 1875, he compiled A Concise Textbook of Harmony Intended to Facilitate the Reading of Sacred Musical Works in Russia.

In an 1877 letter to his friend and patroness Nadezhda von Meck, he wrote:

For me [the church] still possesses much poetical charm. I very often attend the services. I consider the liturgy of St. John Chrysostom one of the greatest productions of art. If we follow the service very carefully, and enter into the meaning of every ceremony, it is impossible not to be profoundly moved by the liturgy of our own Orthodox Church... to be startled from one's trance by a burst from the choir; to be carried away by the poetry of this music; to be thrilled when... the words ring out, 'Praise the name of the Lord!' – all this is infinitely precious to me! One of my deepest joys!

An April 1878 letter to von Meck signified his interest in producing a composition based on the liturgy.

A vast and untrodden field of activity lies open to composers here. I appreciate certain merits in Bortniansky, Berezovsky and others; but how little their music is in keeping with... the whole spirit of Orthodox liturgy! ... It is not improbable that I shall decide to set the entire liturgy of St. John Chrysostom. I shall arrange all this by July.

The composition took place between 4/16 May and 27 May/8 June 1878 (see Old Style and New Style dates). The manuscript was sent to his publisher Pyotr Jurgenson in July; this is confirmed by a letter to von Meck in the same month, where Tchaikovsky wrote that he was "happy in the consciousness of having finished a work... Now I can indulge in full my secret delight in doing nothing." It appeared in print early in 1879.

=== Censorship and legal issues ===
At the time, the prospect of setting any church music was fraught with issues. The Imperial Chapel held the monopoly on the composition and performance of sacred music; according to an 1816 ukase of Tsar Alexander I, all approval had to be granted by the director of the chapel. Tchaikovsky wrote "they guard this monopoly very jealously, and will not permit new settings of the liturgy under any circumstances whatsoever".

Jurgenson's publication of Tchaikovsky's setting was promptly banned by the director of the chapel, Nikolai Bakhmetev, on the grounds that it had been published without his approval. Tchaikovsky had only submitted his setting to the Moscow Office of Sacred Censorship. Legal proceedings were initiated against Jurgenson, and 143 of his plates of the Liturgy were confiscated. The Chief Administration for Printed Matter authorised publication, but Bakhmetev continued his campaign against Jurgenson, who counter-sued Bakhmetev. Jurgenson won his case in June 1879, and the Interior Minister passed judgement in December 1879 in favour of Jurgenson. The confiscated plates were released in November and December 1880 by the Synod, which ruled that the church censor could approve the publication of sacred music without the chapel's involvement. This decision had ground-breaking implications, since for the first time in many years it became possible for Russian composers to create sacred music, without being subjected to bureaucratic review.

=== Performances ===
The first performance took place in the Imperial University of Kiev Church in June 1879. The Moscow Musical Society gave a private concert at the Moscow Conservatory in November 1880; in a letter to Nadezhda von Meck, Tchaikovsky wrote that it was "altogether one of the happiest moments of my musical career".

A public performance given by the Russian Musical Society took place in Moscow in December 1880. The controversy surrounding the work led to an "unusually crowded" audience, which received the work positively and recalled Tchaikovsky numerous times at the end of the concert.

Critical opinion was divided. In his review of the work, César Cui acknowledged the importance of the work and its "almost political significance", but was less complimentary about the work itself:

...choral sonority is exploited with skill and effectiveness; unfortunately, the higher register predominates... [this] gives an impression of festive brilliance and magnificence at first, but then lose their fascination as a result of too frequent repetition... [Tchaikovsky] has brought to his Liturgy an experienced, practised hand and a sense of decorum, rather than powerful inspiration... wholly satisfactory and estimable though it be in itself, [it] holds only secondary place among his other works.

Ambrose, the vicar of Moscow, was particularly opposed to the work; he published a letter in the Rouss, in which he asserted that the public performance of the liturgy was a profanation. "We cannot begin to say how the combination of the words 'Liturgy' and 'Tchaikovsky' offend the ear of the Orthodox Christian", he wrote, and asked what would happen if a Jewish composer should create a setting of the liturgy: "our most sacred words would be mocked at and hissed". Ambrose also refused the performance of Tchaikovsky's Liturgy at his friend Nikolai Rubinstein's funeral. Tchaikovsky's brother Modest wrote that his brother was "deeply hurt" by the vicar's opinion of the work.

== Legacy ==
Tchaikovsky's setting of the Divine Liturgy, along with his All-Night Vigil and his nine sacred songs, were of seminal importance in the later interest in Orthodox music. Other composers, encouraged by the freedom created by the new lack of restriction on sacred music, soon followed Tchaikovsky's example. The structure that Tchaikovsky used, as well as his use of free settings for the components of the liturgy, were emulated by a whole generation of Russian composers in their own settings of the liturgy, including Arkhangelsky, Chesnokov, Gretchaninov, Ippolitov-Ivanov, and Rachmaninoff.

== Music and structure ==
While most of the work uses traditional Slavonic chants with simple homophonic settings, Tchaikovsky composed new music and free settings for six of the movements. These include movements 6, 8, 10, 11, 13 and 14. Movements 10 and 11 have some polyphony and imitation, providing a contrast from the block-chordal arrangement of the majority of the work.

The work consists of 15 major divisions. Performances require approximately 48 minutes.

| Seq. | Church Slavonic (Russian transliteration) | English transliteration | English translation | Part of the liturgy |
|---|---|---|---|---|
| 1 | Аминь. Господи помилуй | Amin. Gospodi pomilui | Amen. Lord have mercy | After the exclamation "Blessed is the Kingdom" |
| 2 | Слава: Единородный Сыне | Slava: Edinorodniy Syne | Glory to the Only-Begotten Son | After the Second Antiphon |
| 3 | Приидите, поклонимся | Priidite, poklonimsya | Come, let us worship | After the Little Entrance |
| 4 | Аллилуйя | Alliluiya | Alleliujah | After the Epistle Reading |
| 5 | Слава Тебе Господи | Slava tyebe gospodi | Glory to Thee, O Lord | After the Gospel Reading |
| 6 | Херувимская песнь | Kheruvimskaya pyesn | Cherubic Hymn | The Liturgy of the Faithful |
| 7 | Господи помилуй | Gospodi pomilui | Lord have mercy | After the Cherubic Hymn |
| 8 | Верую во Единаго Бога Отца | Veruyu vo Yedinago Boga Otsa | I Believe in One God, The Father, The Almighty | The Symbol of Faith (Creed) |
| 9 | Милость мира | Milost mira | A Mercy of Peace | After the Creed |
| 10 | Тебе поем | Tebye poyem | We hymn Thee | After the exclamation "Thine Own of Thine Own" |
| 11 | Достойно есть | Dostoino yest | It is Truly Fitting | After the words "Especially For Our Most Holy" |
| 12 | Аминь. И со Духом Твоим, Господи, помилуй | Amin. I so dukhom tvoyim, Gospodi, pomilui | Amen. And With Your Spirit, Lord Have Mercy | After the exclamation "And Grant That With Our Mouths" |
| 13 | Отче наш | Otche nash | Our Father | The Lord's Prayer |
| 14 | Хвалите Господа с небес | Khvalitye Gospoda s nebyes | Praise the Lord from the Heavens | Communion Hymn |
| 15 | Благословен грядый во имя Господне | Blagoslovyen gryadiy vo imya Gospodnye | Blessed is He Who Comes in the Name of the Lord | After the Exclamation "In the Fear of God" |

== See also ==
- Liturgy of St. John Chrysostom (Rachmaninoff)
- Liturgy of St. John Chrysostom (Leontovych)
- Divine Liturgy of St. John Chrysostom (Mokranjac)
