= Moscow Synodal Choir =

The Moscow Synodal Choir (Московский Синодальный хор), founded 1721, was the choir attached to the Moscow Synodal School prior to its dissolution and merger into the choral faculty of the Moscow Conservatory in 1919. The choir was revived in 1999.

== History ==
The basis of the Synodal Choir was the Russian Patriarchal choir formed in the 16th Century of adult clerics. Following the abolition of the Patriarchate in 1700, the choir became known as the "Cathedral Choir" (соборный хор) attached to the Assumption Cathedral of the Kremlin. Following the establishment of the Holy Synod in 1710, the choir officially became known as the Moscow Synodal Choir. Soon after this boy sopranos and contraltos joined the choir to perform the new polyphonic music.

In 1919 the Moscow Synodal School was dissolved and merged into the Moscow Conservatory, the Choir ceased to perform sacred music and the boy sopranos were released, though Kastalsky continued to perform folk music with the choir till 1923.

The Moscow Synodal Choir was revived with the blessing of Kirill I, Patriarch of Moscow and all Rus', under the conductor Aleksei Puzakov (Алексей Пузаков), People's Artist of Russia, in 2009.

The choir is to be distinguished from the Russian Patriarchate Choir under Anatoly Grindenko (Анатолий Гринденко).

== Selected discography ==
- Metropolitan Hilarion Alfeyev (1966). De Profundis. Compositions for orchestra and choir. Stabat Mater, Concerto grosso, Fugue on the B-A-C-H motif, Canciones de la muerte, De profundis. Moscow Synodal Choir, Russian National Orchestra. Conducted by Metropolitan Hilarion Alfeyev. PENTATONE PTC 5186486 (2015).
