= Liturgy of St. John Chrysostom (Rachmaninoff) =

Choral work by Sergei Rachmaninov

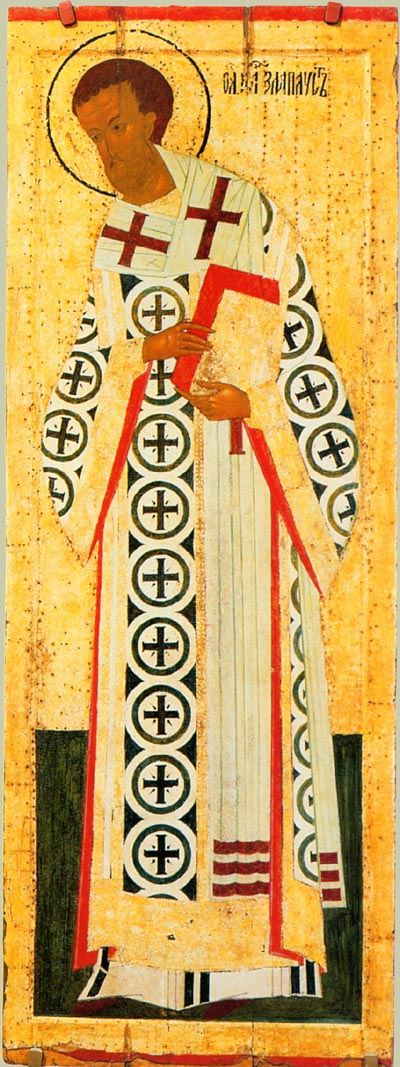
St. John Chrysostom, Icon by Dionisius

Liturgy of St John Chrysostom, Op. 31 (Russian: Литургия Иоанна Златоуста), is a 1910 musical work by Sergei Rachmaninoff, one of his two major unaccompanied choral works (the other being his All-Night Vigil). The Divine Liturgy of St. John Chrysostom is the primary worship service of the Eastern Orthodox Church.

== History ==
Rachmaninoff composed the work in July, 1910 at his summer estate Ivanovka, following his American tour of 1909. Writing to his friend Nikita Morozov, Rachmaninoff said of the work, "I have been thinking about the Liturgy for a long time and for a long time I strove to write it. I started to work on it somehow by chance and then suddenly became fascinated with it. And then I finished it very quickly. Not for a long time have I written anything with such pleasure."

The work premiered November 25, 1910 in Moscow. Russian Orthodox ecclesiastical authorities strongly objected to the work's "spirit of modernism" and refused to sanction it for use during church services. Rachmaninoff did nothing to promote the work himself, and it soon fell into obscurity.

A portion of the Liturgy was given in concert performance in New York on January 24, 1914, by the male choir of the Russian Cathedral of St. Nicholas, conducted by Ivan Gorokhov.

A new edition, reconstructed from surviving part books at an Orthodox monastery in the U.S. and microfilm at the U.S. Library of Congress, was published by Anthony Antolini in 1988. This reconstruction was the subject of a PBS documentary entitled Rediscovering Rachmaninoff, produced by KTEH television in San Jose, California.

== Movements ==
The Liturgy consists of twenty movements for unaccompanied mixed choir. Three contain solo passages: Movement 2 (Blagoslovi, dushe moia, Ghospoda/Bless the Lord, O my soul) for alto, Movement 10 (Veruiu/The Nicene Creed) for Bass, and Movement 12 (Tebie poiem/To Thee we sing), for treble or soprano. Two (Movements 14 and 19) are scored for double choir.

The twenty movements are these:

	Church Slavonic	Transliterated	English
1	Великая ектения	Velikaya ekteniya	The Great Litany
2	Благослови, душе моя, Господа	Blagoslovi, dushe moya, Gospoda	The First Antiphon: Bless the Lord, О My Soul
3	Слава отцу - единородный Сыне	Slava otsu - edinorodnyy Syne	The Second Antiphon: Glory Be to the Father - Only-Begotten Son
4	Во царствие Твоем	Vo tsarstvie Tvoem	The Third Antiphon: In Your Kingdom
5	Приидите, поклонимся	Priidite, poklonimsya	The Little Entrance: Come, Let Us Worship
6	Господи, спаси благочестивыя	Gospodi, spasi blagochestivyya	Trisagion: Lord, We Pray That You May Be Merciful
7	Сугубая ектения	Sugubaya ekteniya	The Augmented Litany
8	Херувимская песнь	Kherubimskaya pesn'	Cherubic Hymn
9	Просительная ектения	Prositel'naya ekteniya	The Litany of Supplication
10	Символ веры: верую	Simvol very: veruyu	Credo
11	Милость мира	Milost' mira	The Eucharistic Prayer: A Mercy Of Peace
12	Тебе поем	Tebe poem	We Praise Thee
13	Достойно есть	Dostoyno est'	Hymn to the Mother of God: It Is Truly Meet
14	Отче наш	Otche nash	The Lord's Prayer: Our Father
15	Един свят	Edin svyat	One Is Holy
16	Хвалите Господа с небес	Khvalite Gospoda s nebes	Communion Hymn: Praise the Lord From The Heavens
17	Благословен граду - Видихом свет	Blagosloven gradu - Vidikhom svet	Blessed Is He - We Have Seen the Light
18	Да исполнятся уста наша	Da ispolnyatsya usta nasha	Hymn Of Praise: Let Our Mouths Be Filled
19	Буди имя Господне	Budi imya Gospodne	Blessed Be the Name of the Lord
20	Отпущение	Otpushchenie	Dismissal

== Recordings ==
Year	Conductor	Choir	Soloists	Label
1978	Mikhil Milkov	Chorus of Bulgarian Radio	Emilia Maximova (soprano); Veselina Zorova (contralto); Yordan Vidov (tenor); Vassil Stoytsov (tenor); Ivan Petrov (bass)	EMI Classics
1982	Karl Linke	Johannes-Damascenus-Chor für ostkirchliche Liturgie, Essen	P. Ludwig Pichler, SJ (Priest); Erwin Lohneisen (Deacon); Lucian Lamka (Lector)	Christophorus Records
1988	Vladimir Minin	Moscow Chamber Choir		Мелодия (Melodiya)
1993	Nikolai Korniev	St. Petersburg Chamber Choir		Philips
1993	Valery Polyansky	Russian State Symphony Cappella Choir		Claves
1994	Matthew Best	Corydon Singers	Peter Scorer (Deacon)	Hyperion
1996	Anthony Antolini	Rachmaninoff Festival Choir	Father Andre Papkov (Bass); Anthony Antolini (Tenor)	
1996	Charles Bruffy	Kansas City Chorale	Father Andre Papkov (Protodeacon); David Adams (Celebrant); Pamela Williamson (Soprano)	Nimbus Records
2002	Olga Stupneva	The Rozhdestvo Choir of Solo Singers of St. Petersburg Philharmonic Society	Irina Mihalkina; Zoe Tsererina; Stanislav Leontiev (tenor); Vitaly Zolatorev; Leonid Gladkov	IMLab
2004	Stephen Cleobury	Choir of King's College, Cambridge	Peter Scorer (Deacon); Tobias Sims	EMI Classics
2006	Kaspars Putniņš	Flemish Radio Choir		Glossa Music
2010	Sigvards Kļava	Latvijas Radio koris (Latvian Radio Choir)	Kārlis Rūtentāls (tenor, Celebrant priest); Gundrars Dziļums (bass, Deacon)	Ondine
2011	Vladislav Chernushenko	St. Petersburg State Capella Choir	Ekatarina Savatskaya (soprano), Egor Semenkov (tenor, Priest), Oleg Radchenko (baritone), Vladimir Miller (basso profundo, Deacon)	IMLab
2015	Nicolas Fink	Rundfunkchor Berlin		Clarus
2022	Kaspars Putniņš	Estonian Philharmonic Chamber Choir		BIS Records

== See also ==
- Liturgy of St. John Chrysostom (Tchaikovsky)
- Liturgy of St. John Chrysostom (Leontovych)
- Divine Liturgy - Main Wikipedia article on the Liturgy of St. John Chrysostom
