= Mykola Pavlovych Dyletsky =

17th-century Ukrainian/Russian composer

- Дилецький Микола Павлович
- Born: c. 1630 probably Kyiv ( Polish-Lithuanian Commonwealth)
- Died: Moscow (Tsardom of Russia)
- Occupations: choir director, composer, music theorist
- Notable work: A Musical Grammar

Signature
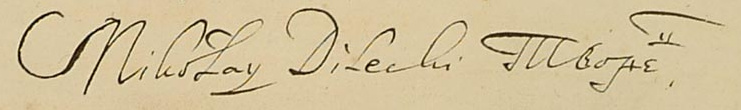

Mykola Pavlovych Dyletsky, also Nikolai Pavlovich Diletsky (Ukrainian: Дилецький Микола Павлович, Russian: Николай Павлович Дилецкий), c. 1630–c. after 1680) was a choir director, music theorist, and composer born in the Kiev Voivodeship of the Polish-Lithuanian Commonwealth and active in the Tsardom of Russia. There is evidence he died in Moscow. Little information about his life is known. He was widely influential in late 17th-century Russia with his treatise on part song, A Musical Grammar, of which the earliest surviving version dates from 1677. Dyletsky's followers included the Russian composer Vasily Titov.

== Life ==
Little is known about Mykola Pavlovych Dyletsky, who at various times during his life lived in Vilnius, Kyiv, Smolensk, and Moscow..

=== Kyiv ===
Ioannikii Trofimovich Korenev, a fellow music theorist, described him as a resident of Kyiv—(zhitel’ grada Kiyeva)—and this remark is considered evidence of Dyletsky's Ukrainian origins. Korenev's statement is probably reliable, as they were apparently were well acquainted. The pair worked together; their treatises are paired in some manuscript sources. However, the date and even the year of Dyletsky's birth are not known, and no details on his early life have surfaced.

=== Vilnius ===
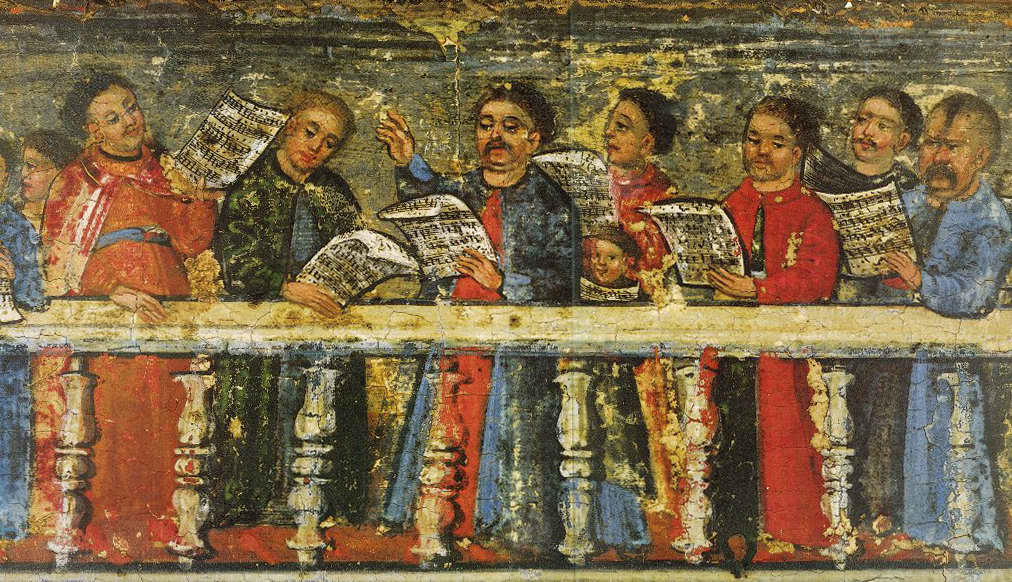
A group of part singers, including the Polish-Lithuanian ruler Jan Sobieski, depicted on a late 17th-century icon

Dyletsky may have been educated at the Vilnius Jesuit High School, where his music teachers were probably the Ukrainian musicians, Ziusky, Mykola Zamarevich, and Martyn Melchevsky. Dyletsky later was employed in the city as a choirmaster and teacher of church singing.

Dyletsky must have moved to Vilnius (then a town in the Polish-Lithuanian Commonwealth) before 1675, because that year his Toga zlota ("The golden toga") was published there by the Franciscan printing press. The text is now lost. It was written in Polish, and the surviving title page indicates that it was probably a panegyrical pamphlet. Some sources indicate that he wrote at least a more extensive musical treatise whilst in Vilnius, now lost: this treatise is first mentioned in Grammatika musikiyskago peniya (1677), and the Idea grammatikii musikiiskoi (1679) is described as a translation of the Vilnius work in its title page. Dyletsky is known to have produced A Method for Training Children for a choir director.

=== Smolensk and Moscow ===
After Vilnius, Dyletsky lived in Smolensk, where in 1677 the first surviving version of his magnum opus, Grammatika musikiyskago peniya ('A Grammar of Musical Singing'), was published. The book, written in six chapters, became the first music theory work of that time. It was a practical manual for composers, theorists, and singing teachers.

Dyletsky moved during the 1670s to Moscow to work as a choirmaster and teacher. There the subsequent two versions of the work appeared in 1679 and 1681. The book appeared in four editions in Vilnius, Smolensk, Moscow. He was probably the director and conductor of the Moscow choir of Grigory Dmitriyevich Stroganov, as he dedicated the Moscow edition of his treatise A Musical Grammar "To the noble, to the illustrious, to his illustrious master, Gr. Dm. Stroganov." However, no evidence has emerged to support the theory that he worked for the Stroganov family.

Nothing further is known about Diletsky's life from 1681 onwards, and it is generally assumed that he died shortly afterwards. His date of birth is projected from this hypothesis. His name is mentioned in a source produced in the 1690s that states he was a "well-known master at the tsar’s court’" (tsarstvennïy preslovushchiy master), without making it clear if he was still alive at that time.

== Works ==
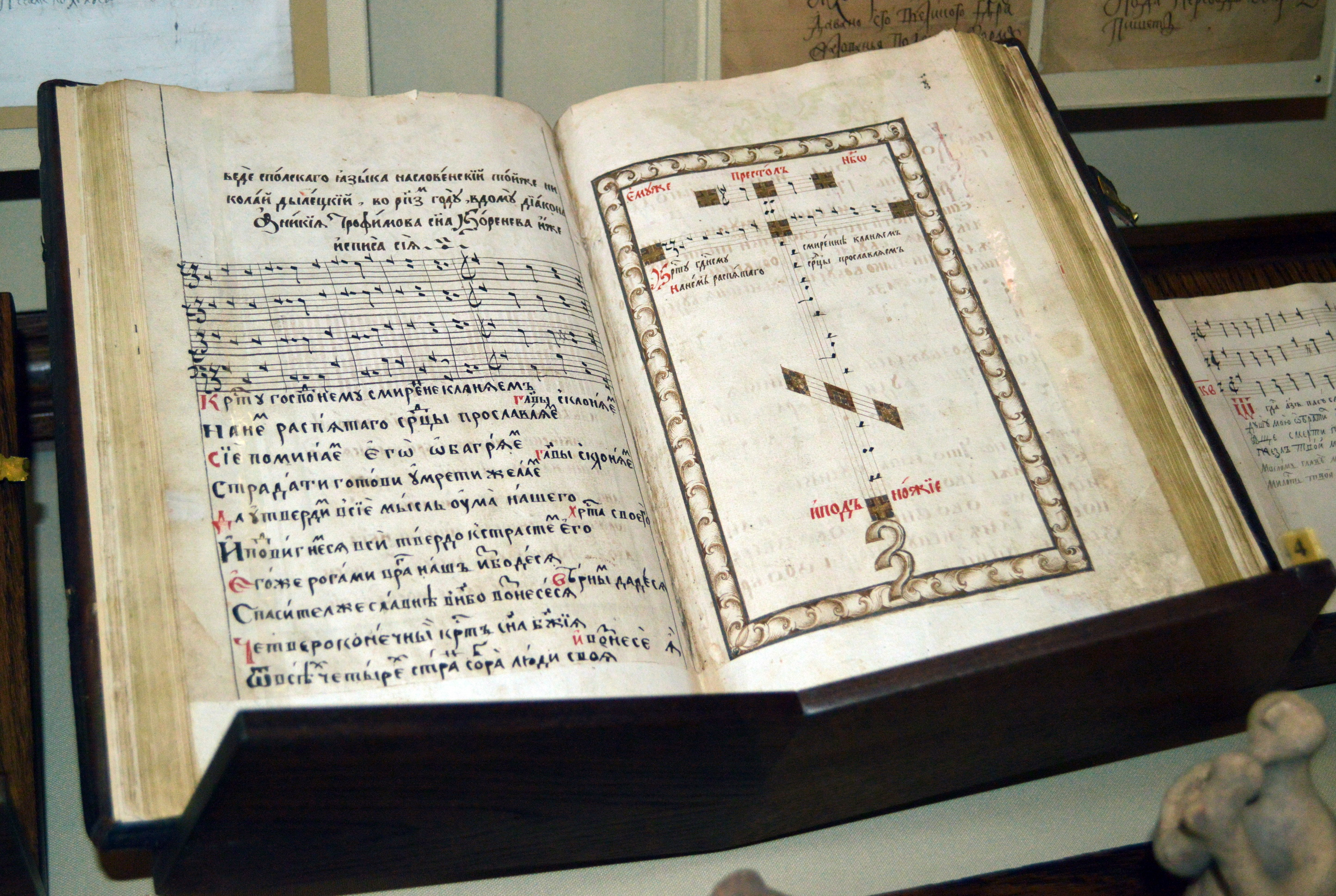
An 18th-century manuscript copy of Dyletsky 's A Musical Grammar (1675), State Historical Museum (Moscow)

Although several of his compositions survive, Diletsky's fame rests chiefly on his composition treatise, Grammatika musikiyskago peniya (A Grammar of Music[al Singing]), which was the first of its kind in Russia. The three surviving versions bear different names, but the content is roughly the same with some important differences. The treatise is in two parts. The first teaches the rudiments of music theory, "relying heavily on Western terminology and theoretical precepts, especially the hexachord", and the second teaches composition of a cappella concertos, a genre that came to Russia through Ukraine and of which Diletsky was one of the first exponents. Diletsky provides a wide variety of examples, both from his own work, including an 8-voice setting of the Divine Liturgy that he composed in Smolensk specifically to illustrate the Grammatika, and from that of contemporary Western composers, particularly the Poles Marcin Mielczewski and Jacek Różycki. Apart from the tremendous influence it had on subsequent generations of Russian church composers, the Grammatika is of particular interest for having the first known description of the circle of fifths, one that antedates Western examples by several decades. The Grammar is recognized by musicologists as an outstanding music theoretical treatise, which summarized almost a century of practice of part song.

== List of works ==
In both his compositions and writings, Diletsky used Kyiv notation exclusively.

=== Writings ===
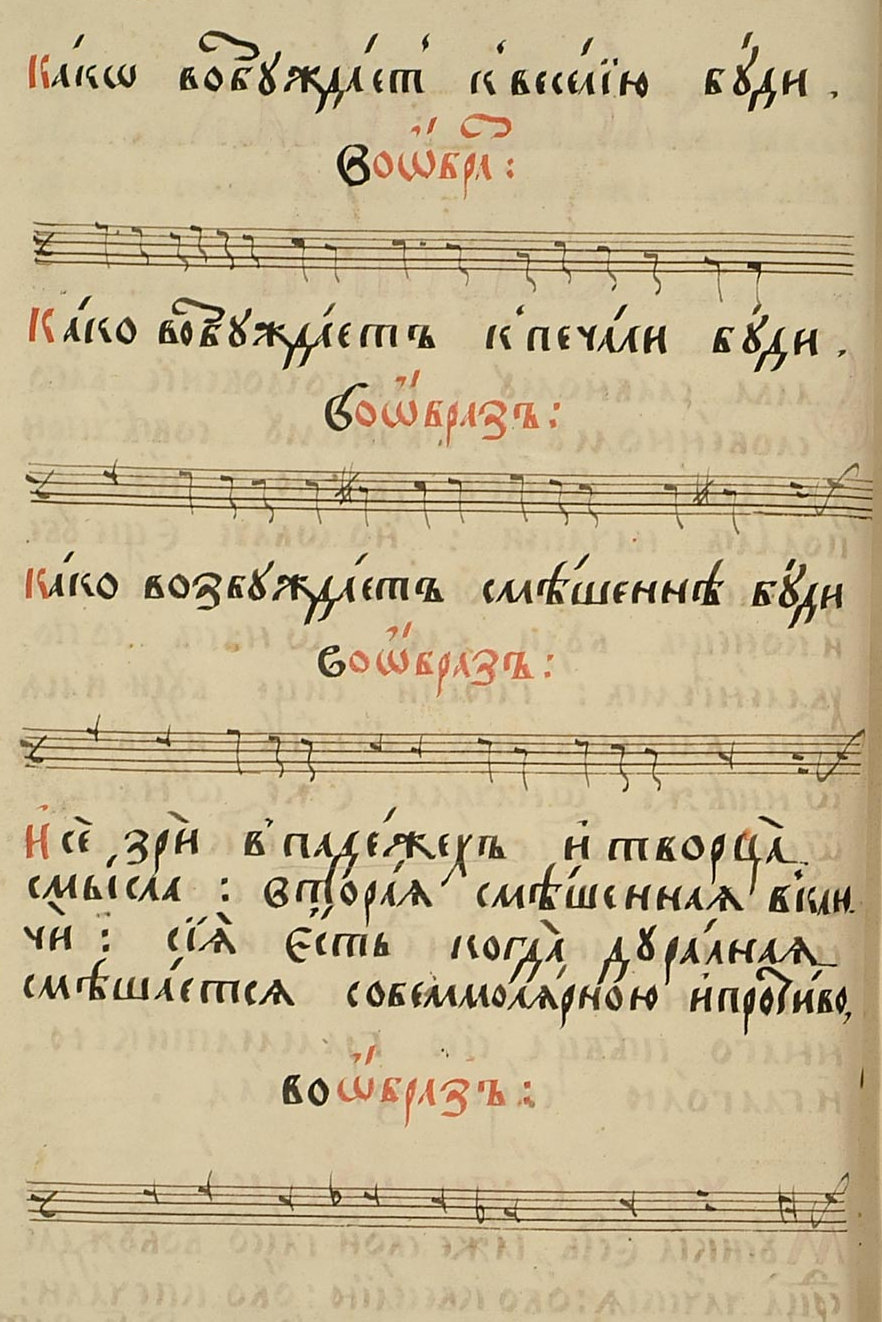
A sample page from Idea grammatiki musikiyskoy (Moscow, 1679)

- Grammatika musikiyskago peniya (Грамматика муcикийского пения, "A grammar of musical song", Smolensk, 1677)
- Idea grammatikii musikiyskoy (Идея грамматикии муcикийской, "An idea of musical grammar", Moscow, 1679),
- Grammatika peniya musikiyskago (Грамматика пения муcикийского, Moscow, 1681)

=== Music ===
Dyletsky's music is polyphonic in style. It replaced the chant that had prevailed for centuries: In 2013, the musicologist Natalya Plotnikova published previously unknown information about 36 four-part concertos by Dyletsky.

- Three settings of the Divine Liturgy for four to eight voices ("Kyivan Chant", "Proportional", and "Resurrection Canon")
- Two sacred concertos (Izhe obra "Tvoemu" for four voices, Voshel esy vo tserkov for eight voices)
- Resurrection/Easter kanon, 8vv
- A eucharistic setting Tlo Hristovo priymyte

== Sources ==
- Dytyniak, Maria (1986). "Дилецький Микола Павлович" [Mykola Pavlovych Dyletsky]. Ukrainian Composers: А Віо-bibliographic Guide [Ukrainian Composers – A Bio-bibliographic Guide – Research report No. 14]. Occasional Research Reports (in Ukrainian). Edmonton, Canada: Canadian Institute of Ukrainian Studies, University of Alberta. OCLC 1037378780.
- Gordiychuk, M.; Kostyuk, O. (1989). Історія української музики [History of Ukrainian Music] (PDF) (in Ukrainian). Vol. 1. Kyiv, Ukraine: M. Rylsky Academy of Sciences of the Ukrainian SSR Institute of Art History, Folklore and Ethnology.
- Jensen, Claudia R. (1992). "A Theoretical Work of Late Seventeenth-Century Muscovy: Nikolai Diletskii's "Grammatika" and the Earliest Circle of Fifths". Journal of the American Musicological Society. 45 (2). University of California Press: 305–331. doi:10.2307/831450. JSTOR 831450.
- Jensen, Claudia R.; Vorob'yov, Yevgeny (2011). "Diletsky [Dїletsky, Dilezki], Nikolay [Nikolai] (Pavlovich) [Dylecki, Mikołaj]". Grove Music Online (8th ed.). Oxford University Press. doi:10.1093/gmo/9781561592630.article.07795. ISBN 978-1-56159-263-0. (subscription, Wikilibrary access, or UK public library membership required)
- Plotnikova, Natalya Yuryevna (2018). "Тексты четырехголосных концертов Николая Дилецкого: вопросы происхождения и классификации вербальных источников" [The texts of Nikolai Diletsky's four-voice concertos: questions of origin and classification of verbal sources] (PDF). PSTGU Bulletin. 5 – Questions of the History and Theory of Christian Art (in Russian) (29): 38–55.
