= Basso profondo =

Vocal range

Basso profondo (Italian: [ˈbasso proˈfondo], "deep bass") is the lowest bass voice type. It is often misspelled as basso profundo.

While The New Grove Dictionary of Opera defines a typical bass as having a range that extends downward to the second E below middle C (E_{2}), operatic bassi profondi can be called on to sing low C (C_{2}), as in the role of Baron Ochs in Der Rosenkavalier. Often choral composers make use of lower notes, such as G_{1} or even F_{1}; in such rare cases the choir relies on exceptionally deep-ranged bassi profondi termed octavists, who may sing an octave below the bass part.

Bass singer Tim Storms holds the Guinness World Record for the "lowest note produced by a human".

== Definition ==
Basso profondo voice range (C_{2}–C_{4}) indicated on piano keyboard in green with dot marking middle C

Range of a basso profondo according to the Italian definition ranging from C_{2} to F_{4}

According to Rousseau (1775): "Basse-contres – the most profound of all voices, singing lower than the bass like a double bass, and should not be confused with contrabasses, which are instruments."

== Octavist ==
An octavist (German: Oktavist) is an exceptionally deep-ranged basso profondo, especially typical of Russian Orthodox choral music. This voice type has a vocal range which extends down to A_{1} (an octave below the baritone range) and sometimes to F_{1} (an octave below the bass staff) with the extreme lows for octavists, such as Mikhail Zlatopolsky or Alexander Ort, reaching C_{1}.

Slavic choral composers sometimes make use of lower notes such as B♭_{1} as in Rachmaninoff's All-Night Vigil, G♯_{1} in "The Twelve Brigands", G_{1} in "Ne otverzhi mene" by Pavel Chesnokov, or F_{1} in "Kheruvimskaya pesn" ("Song of Cherubim") by Krzysztof Penderecki, although such notes sometimes also appear in repertoire by non-Slavic composers (e.g. B♭_{1} appears in Gustav Mahler's Second and Eighth Symphonies).

In popular culture several a capella groups have bass singers with an octavist range, such as Home Free's Tim Foust, VoicePlay's Geoff Castellucci, and Avi Kaplan formerly of Pentatonix, as well as Tony-nominated Broadway performer Patrick Page, each of these being able to reach down to a G_{1} or in some cases even lower, with Castellucci able to hit a B_{0} using subharmonic singing and Foust able to hit a G_{0} using growl.

== See also ==
- Fach
- Vocal weight
