= Easter Vigil =

Liturgy held in Christian churches

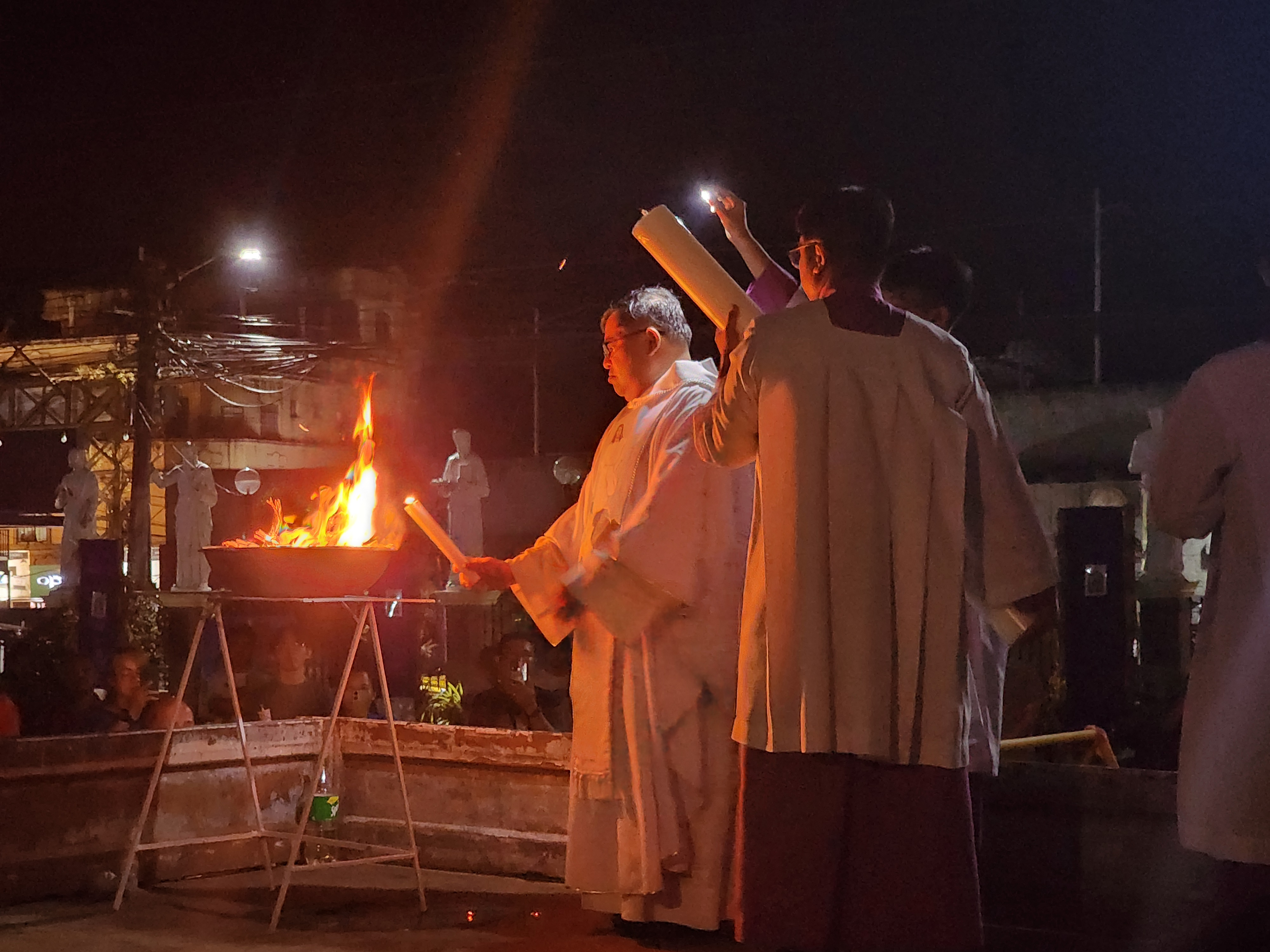
A Catholic priest in front of the Easter fire while altar servers hold a Paschal candle, which is to be lit from the fire

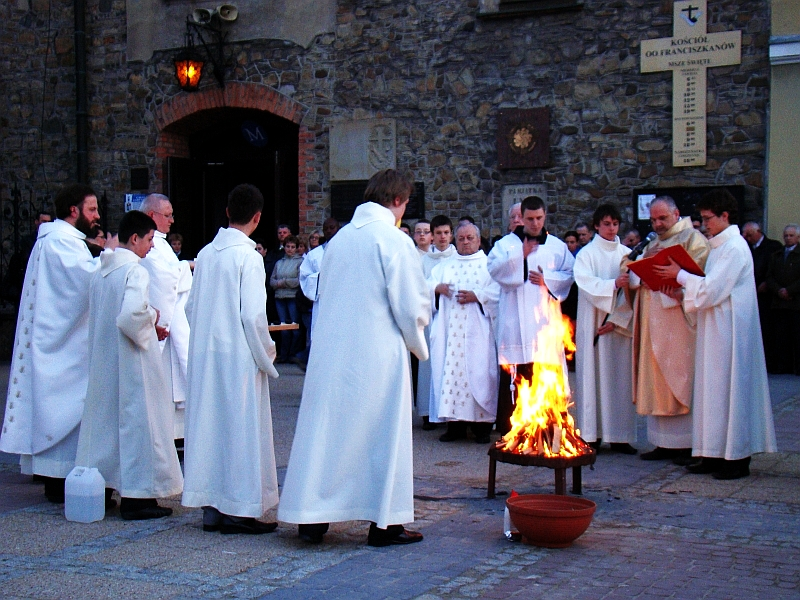
Liturgical Easter fire, Sanok (2010)

The Easter Vigil, also known as the Paschal Vigil, the Great Vigil of Easter, or Holy Saturday at the Easter Vigil in the Holy Night of Easter, is a liturgy held in traditional Christian churches as the first official celebration of the Resurrection of Jesus. Historically, it is during this liturgy that people are baptized and that adult catechumens are received into full communion with the Church. It is held in the hours of darkness between sunset on Holy Saturday and sunrise on Easter Day – most commonly in the evening of Holy Saturday or midnight – and is the first celebration of Easter, days traditionally being considered to begin at sunset.

Among liturgical Western Christian churches including the Roman Catholic Church, the Lutheran Churches and the Anglican Communion, the Easter Vigil is the most important liturgy of public worship and Mass of the liturgical year, marked by the first use since the beginning of Lent of the exclamatory "Alleluia", a distinctive feature of the Easter season.

In the Moravian Church, the sunrise service starts before dawn on Easter Sunday. Congregations of the Reformed tradition and the Methodist tradition may observe the Easter Vigil or hold a sunrise service. In Eastern Orthodox churches, Oriental Orthodox churches, and other traditions of Eastern Christianity, the extremely festive ceremonies and Divine Liturgy which are celebrated during the Easter Vigil are unique to that night and are the most elaborate and important of the liturgical year.

== Earliest known form ==
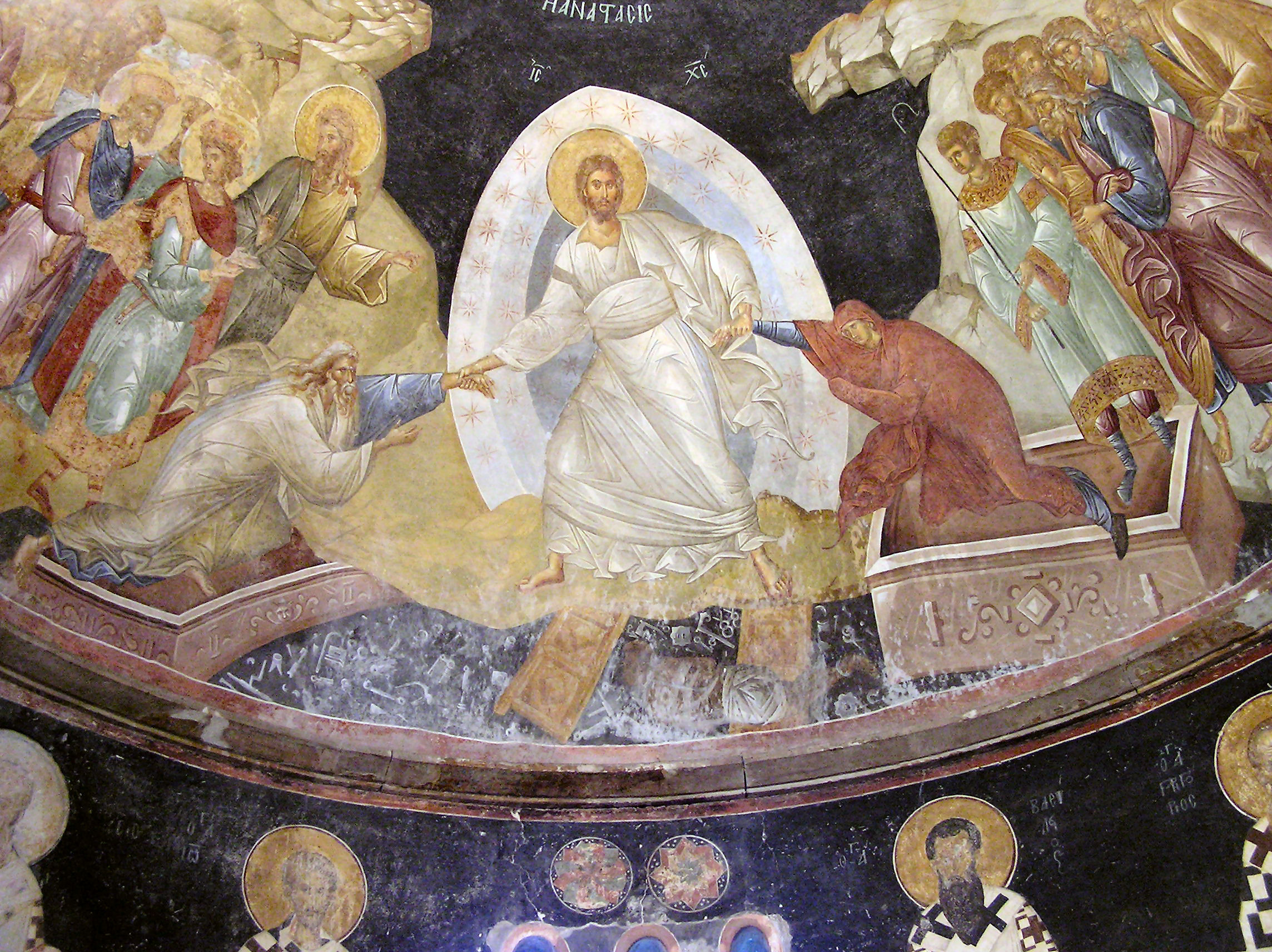
14th-century fresco of the Anastasis, ancient Chora Church, Istanbul

The original twelve Old Testament readings for the Easter Vigil survive in an ancient manuscript belonging to the Armenian Patriarchate of Jerusalem. The Armenian Easter Vigil also preserves what is believed to be the original length of the traditional gospel reading of the Easter Vigil, i.e., from the Last Supper account to the end of the Gospel according to Matthew. In the earliest Jerusalem usage the vigil began with Psalm 117 [118] sung with the response, "This is the day which the Lord has made." Then followed twelve Old Testament readings, all but the last being followed by a prayer with kneeling.

(1) Genesis 1:1–3:24 (the story of creation); (2) Genesis 22:1–18 (the binding of Isaac); (3) Exodus 12:1–24 (the Passover charter narrative); (4) Jonah 1:1–4:11 (the story of Jonah); (5) Exodus 14:24–15:21 (crossing of the Red Sea); (6) Isaiah 60:1–13 (the promise to Jerusalem); (7) Job 38:2–28 (the Lord's answer to Job); (8) 2 Kings 2:1–22 (the assumption of Elijah); (9) Jeremiah 31:31–34 (the New Covenant); (10) Joshua 1:1–9 (entry into the Promised Land); (11) Ezekiel 37:1–14 (the valley of dry bones); (12) Daniel 3:1–29 (the story of the three youths).

The twelfth reading leads into the Song of the Three Children and is not followed by a prayer with kneeling, but is immediately followed by the prokeimenon of the Eucharistic liturgy. Thomas Talley stresses the importance of this series of reading as representing the oldest known series and the one evidently having the very greatest influence on the development of all subsequent series of readings.

According to Byzantine historian Andrew Ekonomou, the Easter Vespers was unknown in Rome prior to its introduction in the mid-7th century, and solemnization by Pope Vitalian during the period when Rome was part of the Byzantine Empire. The Paschal vespers was long celebrated in Constantinople prior to this and the liturgy itself has details that appear eastern in origin.

== Western Christian Churches ==
=== Catholic Churches ===
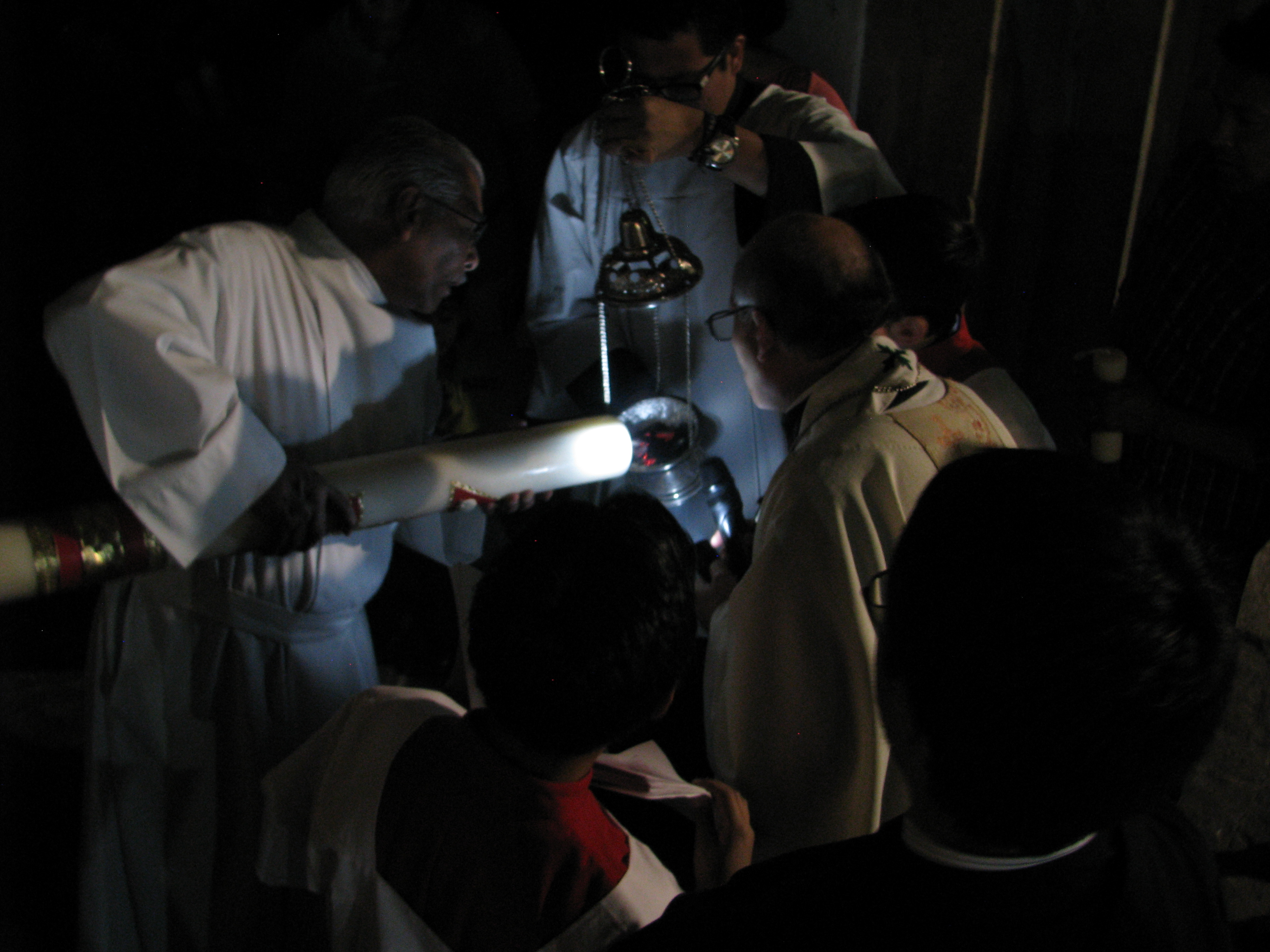
Lighting of a paschal candle in Mexico City

The Roman Missal states: "Of this night’s Vigil, which is the greatest and most noble of all solemnities, there is to be only one celebration in each church. It is arranged, moreover, in such a way that after the Lucernarium and the "Exsultet", The Easter Proclamation (which constitutes the first part of this Vigil), Holy Church meditates on the wonders the Lord God has done for his people from the beginning, trusting in his word and promise (the second part, that is, the Liturgy of the Word) until, as day approaches, with new members reborn in Baptism (the third part), the Church is called to the table the Lord has prepared for his people, the memorial of his Death and Resurrection until he comes again (the fourth part)."

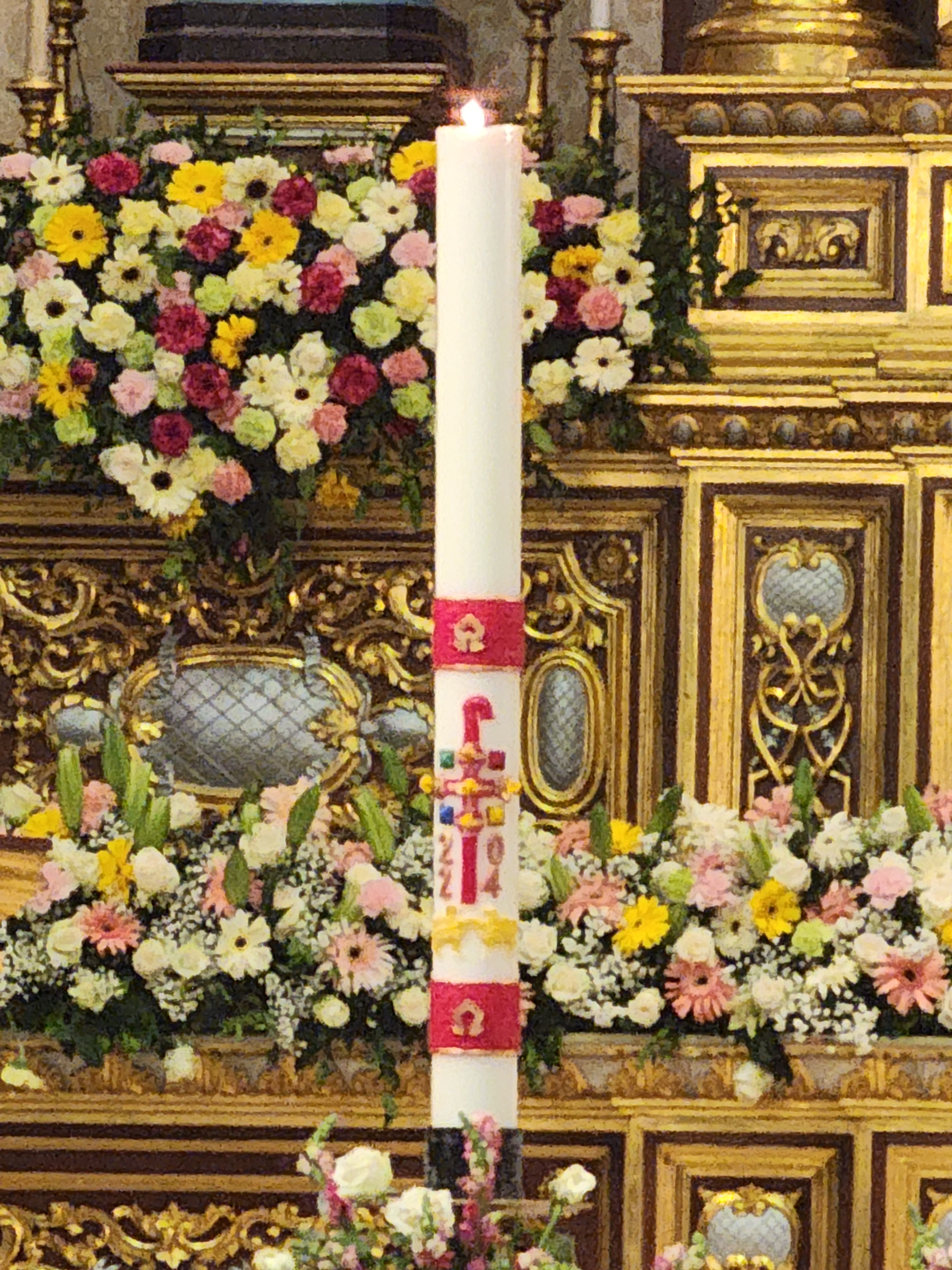
Ibaan Easter candle (2024)

In the Roman Rite liturgy, the Easter Vigil consists of five parts:

1. The Lucernarium
2. The Liturgy of the Word
3. The rite of Baptism
  (Consecration of the water of baptism and bestowal of the sacrament of baptism if there are catechumens. Renewal of the baptismal vows by the whole congregation, followed by the Asperges)
4. Liturgy of the Eucharist

The vigil begins between sunset on Holy Saturday and sunrise on Easter Sunday outside the church, where an Easter fire is kindled and the Paschal candle is blessed and then lit. This Paschal candle will be used throughout the season of Easter, remaining in the sanctuary of the church or near the lectern, and throughout the coming year at baptisms and funerals, reminding all that Christ is "light and life".

Once the candle has been lit, it is carried by a deacon through the nave of the church, itself in complete darkness, stopping three times to chant the acclamation 'Light of Christ' (Lumen Christi), to which the assembly responds 'Thanks be to God' or 'Deo Gratias'. As the candle proceeds through the church, the small candles held by those present are gradually lit from the Paschal candle. As this symbolic "Light of Christ" spreads, darkness is decreased.

The deacon, priest, or a cantor now chants the Exsultet (also called the "Easter Proclamation" or "Paschal Praeconium"), after which the people sit for the Liturgy of the Word.

Once the paschal candle has been placed on its stand in the sanctuary, the lights in the church are switched on and the congregation extinguish their candles (although in some churches, the custom is to continue the liturgy by candlelight or without any lights until the Gloria).

The Liturgy of the Word consists of seven readings from the Old Testament, although it is permitted to reduce this number for pastoral reasons to at least three, or for very pressing pastoral reasons two. The account of the Israelites' crossing of the Red Sea may never be omitted, since this event is at the centre of the Jewish Passover, of which Christians believe Christ's death and resurrection is the fulfillment.

(1) Genesis 1:1–2:2 (the story of creation); (2) Genesis 22:1–18 (the binding of Isaac); (3) Exodus 14:15–15:1 (crossing of the Red Sea); (4) Isaiah 54:5–14; (5) Isaiah 55:1–11; (6) Baruch 3:9–15,32–4:4; (7) Ezekiel 36:16–17a, 18–28.

Each reading is followed by a psalm or biblical canticle (i.e., 1. Psalm 104 or Psalm 33; 2. Psalm 16; 3. Exodus 15:1–18; 4. Psalm 30; 5. Isaiah 12:2–6; 6. Psalm 19; 7. when Baptism is celebrated: a combination of Psalm 42 and Psalm 43; 7. when Baptism is not celebrated: Isaiah 12:2–6 or Psalm 51) sung responsorially and followed by a prayer that relates what has been read in the Old Testament to the mystery of Christ. After these readings conclude, the altar candles are lit. The Gloria in excelsis Deo is sung for the first time since before Lent, with the exception of Holy Thursday or any solemnities or feasts that occurred during Lent.

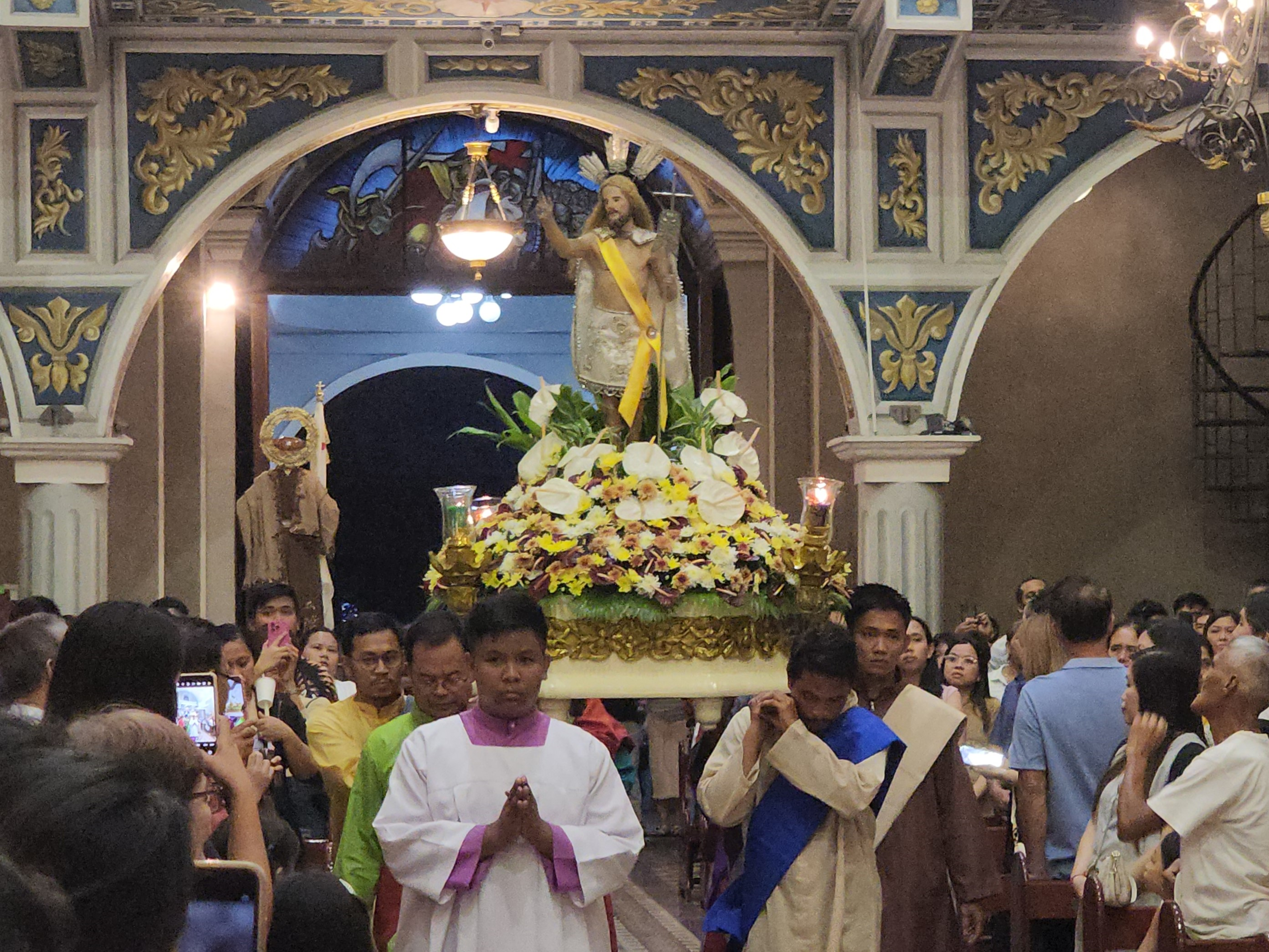
In some churches, during the singing of the Gloria, the image of the Risen Christ is processed into the church.

The church bells and the organ, silent, since that point on Holy Thursday, are sounded again. It is customary in some churches to have no organ playing during Lent at all, except when accompanying hymns. In some regions, the statues, which have been covered during Passiontide, are unveiled at this time. After Gloria in Excelsis Deo, the collect is sung or recited by the celebrant. The reading from the Epistle to the Romans (Romans 6:3–11) is proclaimed, followed by the chanting of Psalm 118. The Alleluia is sung for the first time since before Lent and with special solemnity. The Gospel of the Resurrection (Matthew 28:1–10, Mark 16:1–8, or Luke 24:1–12 depending on the liturgical year) follows, along with a homily.

After the conclusion of the Liturgy of the Word, the water of the baptismal font is solemnly blessed, and any catechumens and candidates for full communion are initiated into the church by baptism or confirmation. After the celebration of these sacraments of initiation, the congregation renews their baptismal vows and receive the sprinkling of baptismal water. The prayer of the faithful, of whom the newly baptised are now part, follow.

After the prayers, the Liturgy of the Eucharist continues as usual. This is the first Mass of Easter Day. During the Eucharist, the newly baptized receive Holy Communion for the first time. According to the rubrics of the Roman Missal, the Eucharist should finish before dawn.

=== Lutheran Churches ===
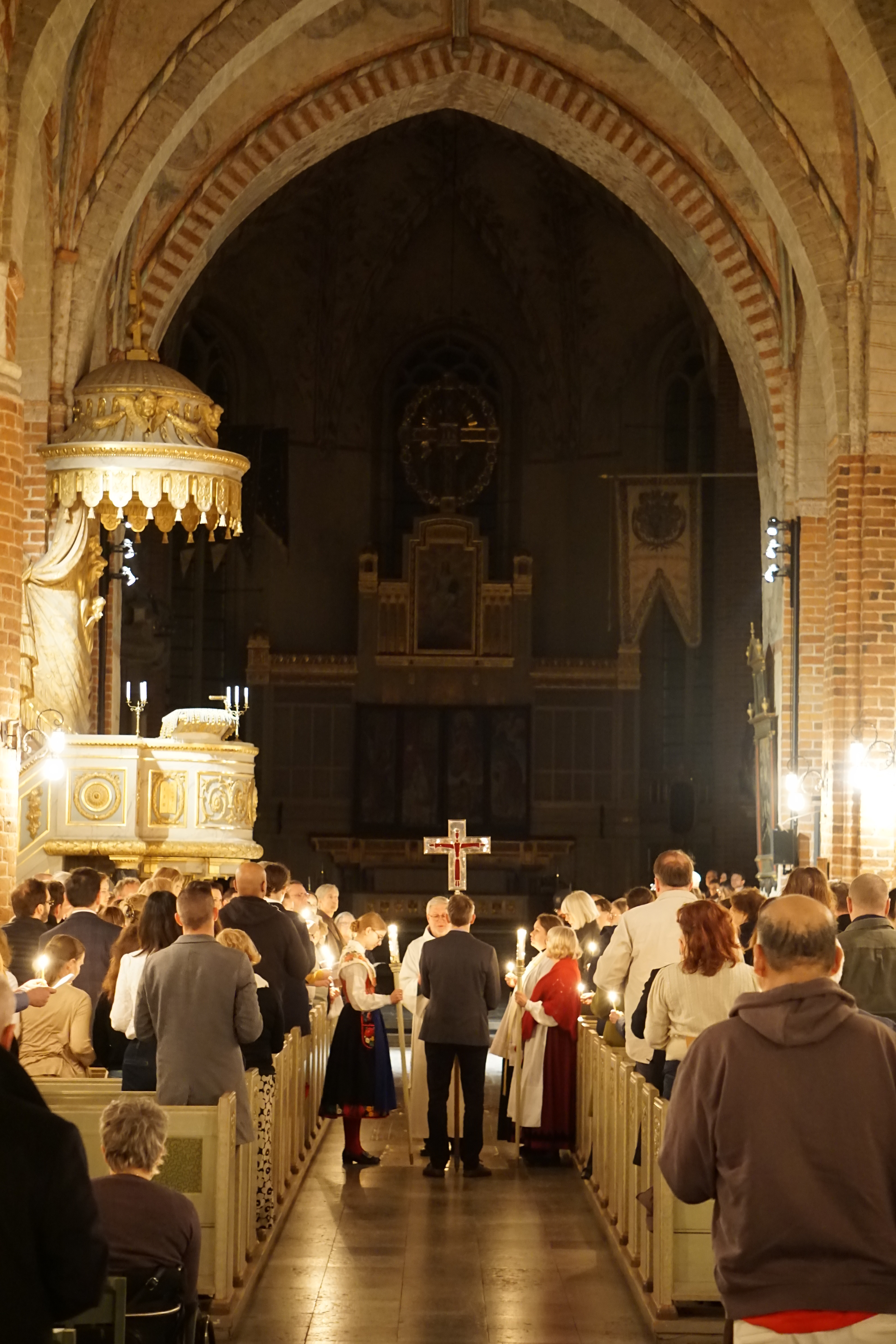
The celebration of the Easter Vigil Mass at Strängnäs Evangelical-Lutheran Cathedral, part of the Church of Sweden (2026)

The Easter Vigil, like the Christmas Vigil, remained a popular festive worship service in the Lutheran churches during and after the Reformation. It was often celebrated in the early morning hours of Easter Sunday. As in all Lutheran services of this period, vernacular language was used in combination with traditional liturgical texts in Latin, such as the Exsultet. Elements which were considered unbiblical and superstitious were eliminated, such as the blessing of the new fire, the consecration of the candles or of water.

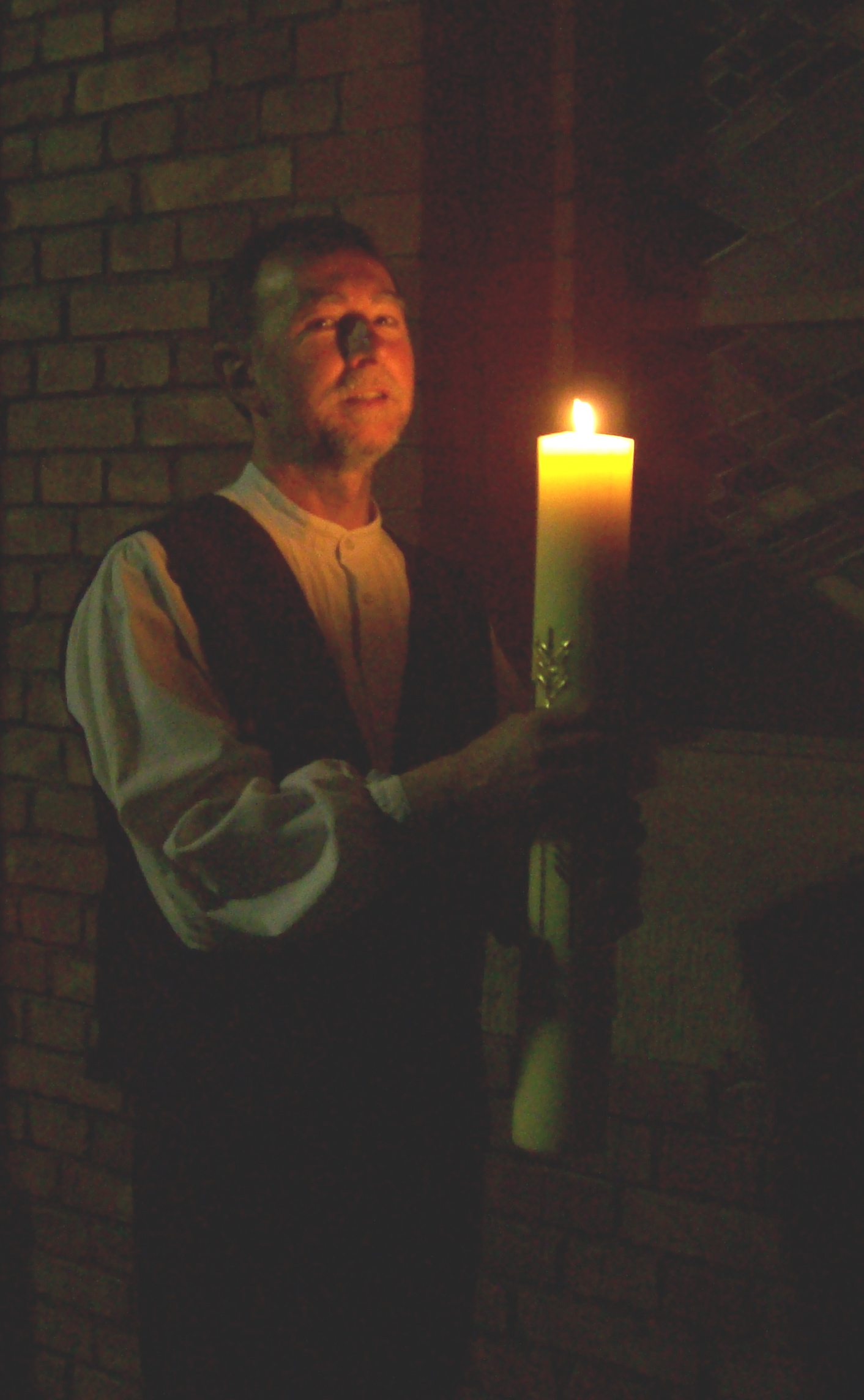
A Lutheran deacon with an Easter candle

Emphasis was placed on the scriptural readings, congregational singing and on the Easter sermon. In Wittenberg the Easter Gospel (Matthew 28. 1–10; 16–20) was sung in the German language in a tone similar to the tone of the Exsultet - a gospel tone only used for this worship service. The devastation caused by the Thirty Years' War led to a decline in worship culture in the Lutheran Churches in Germany. The rationalism of the 18th century also brought about a change in worship habits and customs. The liturgical movement that arose in the German Lutheran Churches after World War I rediscovered the Easter Vigil in its reformational form.

In an article from 1934 for the Liturgical Conference of Lower Saxony and for the Berneuchen Movement, Wilhelm Stählin appealed to fellow Lutherans for an Easter service on early Easter Sunday or on Holy Saturday night using elements from the Missal, the Orthodox tradition and from reformational service orders. An order for the Easter Vigil was published in 1936. Several Lutheran congregations in Hannover observed the Easter Vigil in 1937. Since then, the Easter Vigil has experienced a revival in many parishes throughout Germany.

This movement within the German Lutheran Churches contributed to a revival and revision of the Roman Catholic order for the Easter Vigil by Pope Pius XII in 1951. The "Agende II" for the Evangelical Lutheran Churches and Parishes in Germany from 1960 gave the "Osternacht", German for "Easter Vigil", a normative form. The most recent agenda for the Easter Vigil was published by the "Vereinigte Evangelisch-lutherische Kirche" in 2008.

The order for the Easter Vigil is comparable to the order of service used by American Lutherans. It is characterized by a number of Gregorian chants, medieval and reformational hymns which have been in use in German worship services for centuries.

In North America the Lutherans, similarly to the Anglicans, have in many places returned to the observance of the Easter Vigil [including the restoration of the blessing of the new fire]. The recent service books of both the Lutheran Church–Missouri Synod and the Evangelical Lutheran Church in America assume the service as normative.

In the Lutheran Service Book, the Altar Book, the Vigil comprises the Service of Light with the Exsultet; the Service or Readings with up to 12 readings; the Service of Holy Baptism at which candidates may be baptized, the baptized confirmed, and the congregation remember its Baptism into Jesus; the Service of Prayer, featuring an Easter litany; and concluding with the Service of the Sacrament, at which the Holy Eucharist is celebrated.

=== Anglican Churches ===
Although the Easter Vigil is not universal in the Anglican Communion, its use has become far more common in recent decades. Formerly it was only common in parishes in the Anglo-Catholic tradition, having been recovered by the 19th-century Tractarian movement.

The service, as provided for example in the current version of the Book of Common Prayer of the Episcopal Church in the United States of America (TEC), the Book of Alternative Services of the Anglican Church of Canada and the Times and Seasons volume of the Church of England's Common Worship, follows more or less the same form as the Roman Catholic liturgy described above, with some variations in texts and ritual. The four-part structure of the Vigil is retained, though in the TEC rite the service of baptism may follow immediately after the readings from the Old Testament.

The service normally consists of four parts:

1. The Service of Light.
2. The Service of Lessons.
3. Christian Initiation, or the Renewal of Baptismal Vows.
4. The Holy Eucharist with the administration of Easter Communion.

Some of the other particular differences from the Roman Catholic observance include:

1. If the service of baptism takes place after the Old Testament readings, the Gloria is sung after the Baptism or Renewal of Baptismal Vows. The Te Deum Laudamus or the Pascha Nostrum may be used in place of the Gloria.
2. The number and particular passages in the Service of Lessons differs. There are up to nine (as opposed to seven) readings from the Hebrew Bible.

Confirmations occur only when the bishop is present, because, in the Anglican tradition, only a bishop may administer confirmation.

=== Reformed Churches ===
In the Reformed Church, the Easter Vigil follows the pattern of Service of Light, Service of the Word, Service of Baptism, and Service of Communion. It can either start on the night of Holy Saturday or is held as a sunrise service on Easter Sunday.

=== Methodist Churches ===
In Methodist congregations that observe it, the Easter Vigil is the first service of Eastertide. The liturgy contained in The United Methodist Book of Worship divides the Easter Vigil into four parts:

1. The Service of Light
2. The Service of the Word
3. The Service of the Baptismal Covenant
4. The Service of the Table

The Service of Light begins in silence outside of the church building in the nighttime. There, a new fire is kindled and each member of the congregation is given a candle. A greeting, opening prayer and lighting of the Paschal Candle from the new fire then solemnly occurs. The clergy and congregation receive the new light from the Paschal candle and then take part in a procession into the church, as a hymn is sung.

The Easter Proclamation is then chanted by a deacon. If there is no deacon, a concelebraing minister does the task. If there is no concelebrating minister, it is entrusted to a lay cantor. The Service of the Word contains readings explicating the following topics: "The Creation", "The Covenant between God and the Earth", "Abraham's Trust in God", "Israel's Deliverance at the Red Sea", "Salvation Offered Freely to All", "A New Heart and a New Spirit", "New Life for God's People", and "Buried and Raised with Christ in Baptism".

After each reading, a canticle is sung and then a prayer is offered. Following the hearing of the "record of God's saving deeds in history", the Gospel lesson is proclaimed by the minister. Then he/she gives the sermon. The Service of the Baptismal Covenant follows with the baptism of catechumens and then their confirmation, as well as that of those who are being received into the United Methodist Church. The Service of the Table includes the celebration of Holy Communion. It is concluded by a benediction and recessional hymn.

== Eastern Christian Churches ==
=== Byzantine Rite ===
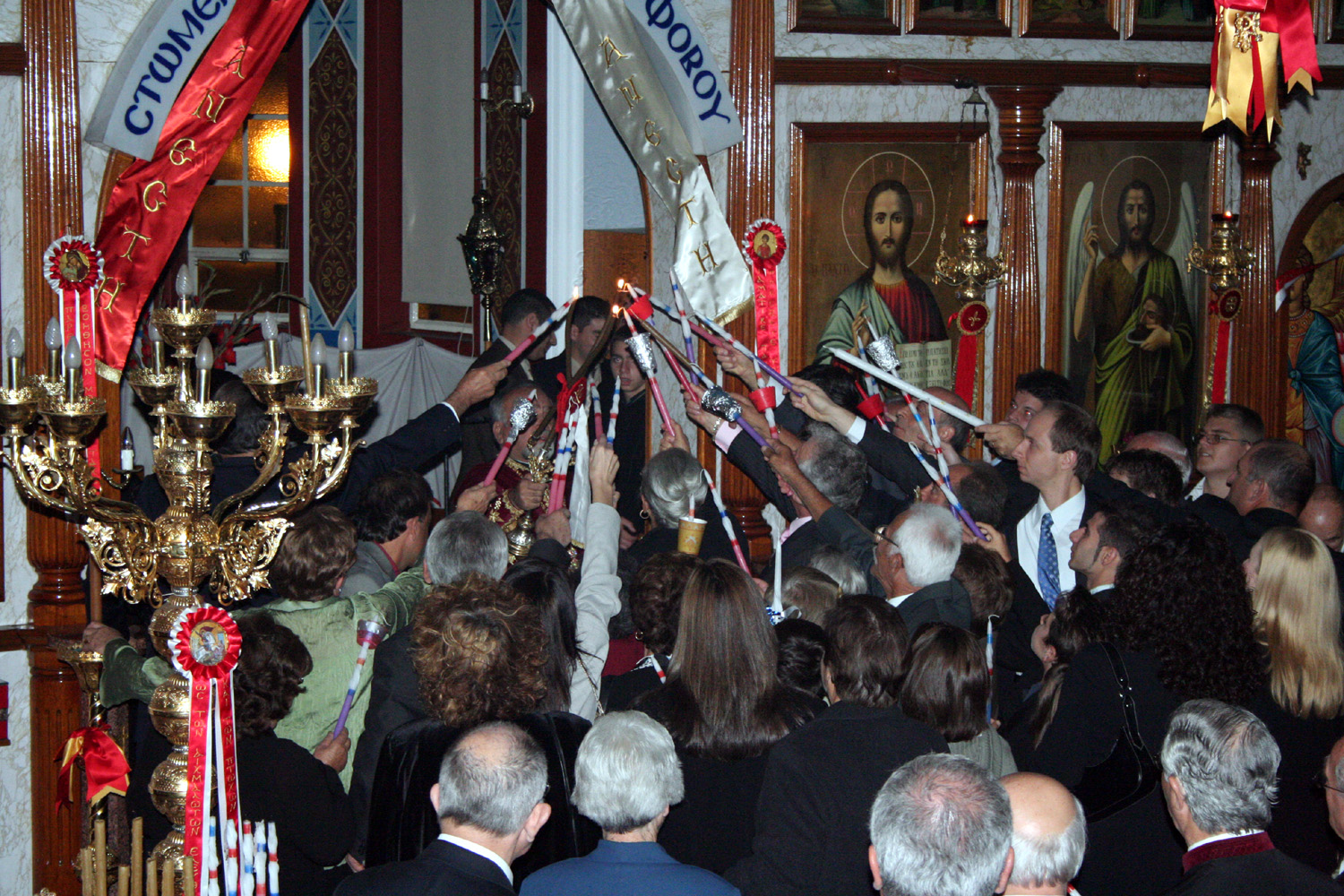
The congregation lighting their candles from the new flame which the priest has retrieved from the altar. (St. George Greek Orthodox Church, in Adelaide, Australia).

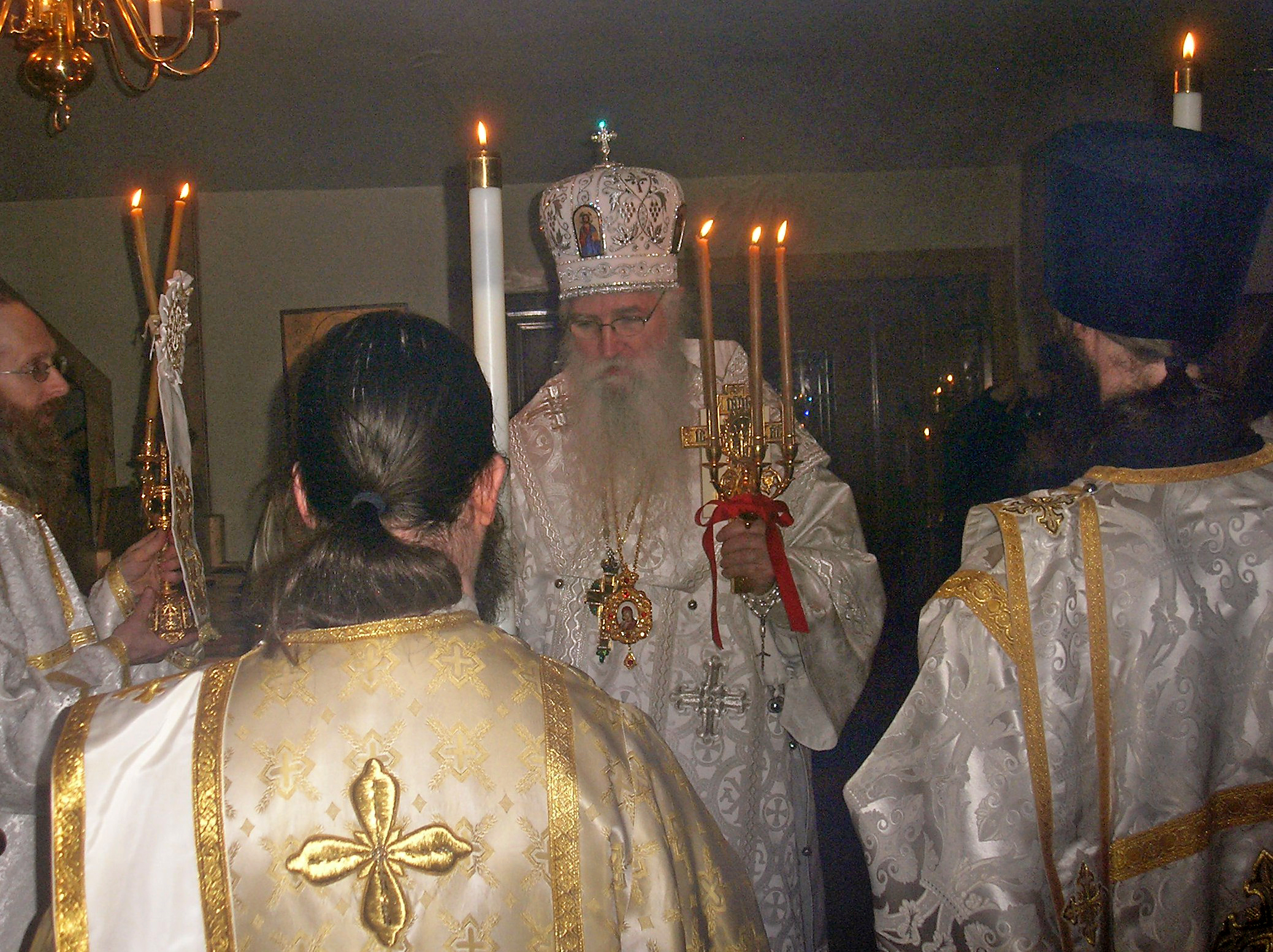
At paschal matins, a bishop holds the pascal trikiron and deacons (facing the bishop) hold paschal candles. (Holy Cross Monastery in Wayne, West Virginia.)

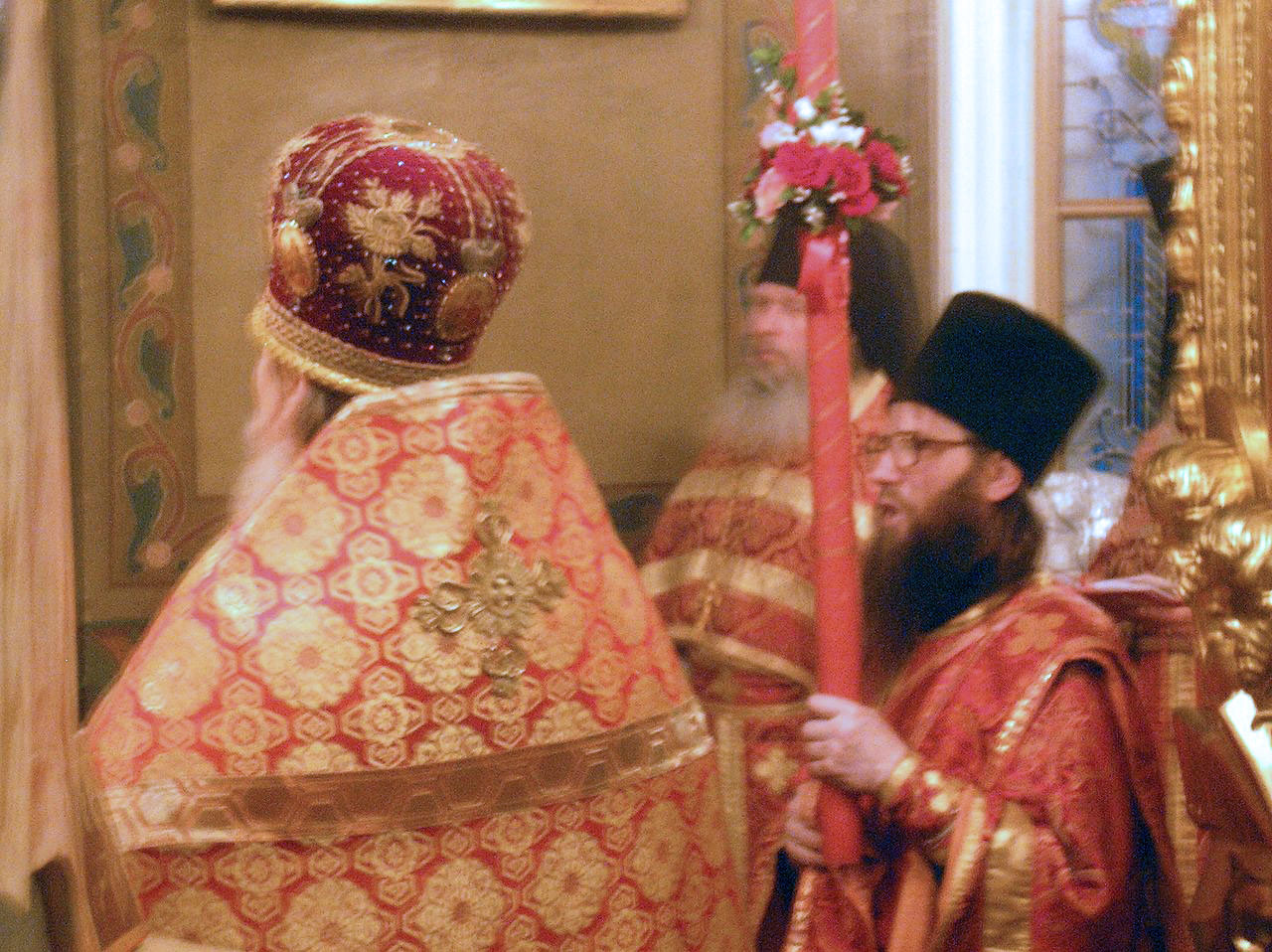
A deacon holds a red paschal deacon's candle at paschal matins (The Trinity Lavra, in Sergiyev Posad, Russia).

In popular culture and for most believers, the Paschal vigil is the liturgy that commences at midnight; however, the vigil proper commences with vespers Saturday afternoon.

==== Saturday Midday ====
Commencing two hours before sundown according to the written rubrics, although generally in the late morning in actual practice, is great vespers with the Divine Liturgy. It is during this liturgy that catechumens are baptized and that fact, together with the lengthy Old Testament readings, shows that this liturgy is analogous to the Easter vigil described in the previous sections, seemingly representing development from a common tradition.

The Old Testament readings are:

1. Genesis 1:1–13; 2. Isaiah 60:1–16; 3. Exodus 12:1–11; 4. Jonah 1:1–4:11; 5. Joshua 5:10–15; 6. Exodus 13:20–15:19; 7. Zephaniah 3:8–15; 8. 3 Kings 17:8–24; 9. Isaiah 61:10–62:5; 10. Genesis 22:1–18; 11. Isaiah 61:1–9; 12. 4 Kings 4:8–37; 13. Isaiah 63:11–64:5; 14. Jeremiah 31:31–34; 15. Daniel 3:1–68.

It is during these readings that catechumens may be baptized and chrismated, the order of which is given in the Book of Needs (Ευχολόγιον; Требникъ) and is performed while most of the faithful and clergy remain in the church for the readings, the newly baptised being led back into the church during the singing of "As many as have been baptized into Christ have put on Christ" (sung in place of the Trisagion).

This liturgy recounts the Harrowing of Hell, at which time, according to Orthodox theology, the righteous dead were raised from Hades and entered into Paradise. This Good News of Christ's triumph over death, the Church teaches, was at that time revealed only to the departed. The revelation to the living occurred when his tomb was found empty "very early in the morning, on the first day of the week" (Mark 16:2) and this vigil recounts that discovery of the empty tomb. Also commemorated is the Passover of the Law, which according to the Gospel of John, was on the Sabbath when Christ lay in the tomb, and among the Old Testament readings is the story of the Exodus out of Egypt, that reading ending with the antiphonal singing of the Song of Moses (Exodus 15:1–19).

Although this vespers liturgy begins Sunday in the usual manner, including the resurrectional stichera of the first tone, the feast of Pascha begins in the middle of the night, at the time Christ rose from the dead, while the text of and rubrics for Saturday's liturgy are found in the Triodion, the Lenten liturgical book.

Before the Gospel reading, in place of the "Alleluia" sung at every other Liturgy of the year, is a prokeimenon during which, in the Russian tradition, all vestments and decorations of the church are quickly and dramatically changed from black to white. Another feature unique to this Liturgy is that the usual Cherubic Hymn is replaced by that from the Liturgy of St. James, "Let all mortal flesh keep silence".

In Jerusalem, the Greek Orthodox Patriarch receives the Holy Fire and subsequently celebrates the Divine Liturgy at the Holy Sepulchre (i.e., empty tomb) of Christ on the very place where his body lay at the time of his Resurrection.

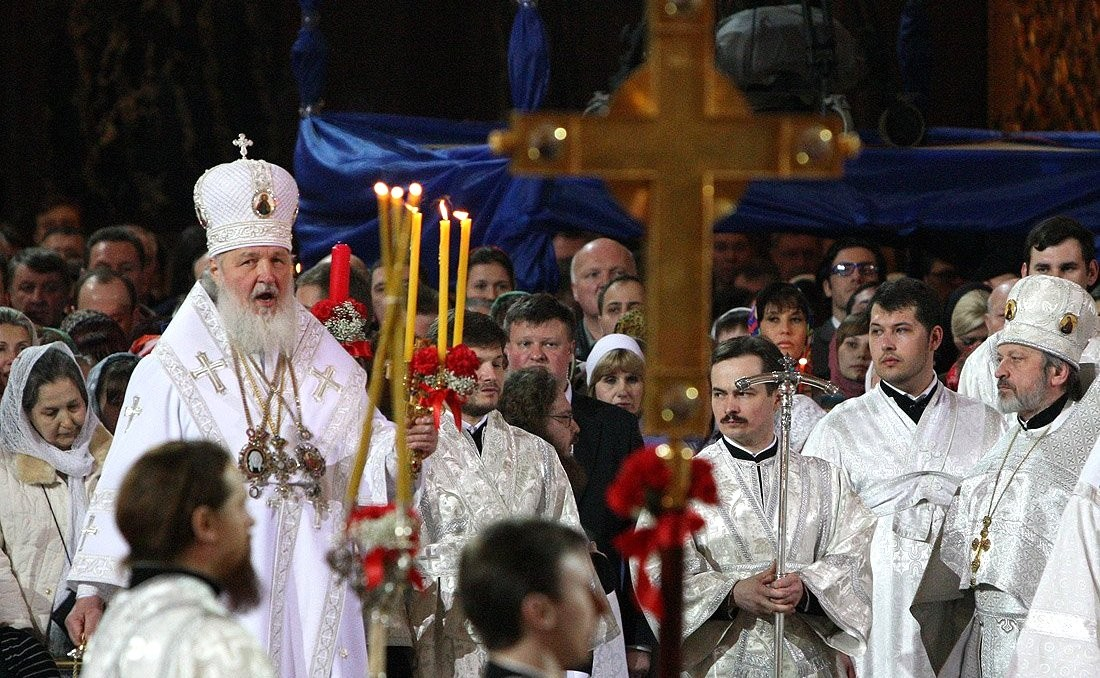
Russian Easter liturgy by Patriarch Kirill of Moscow (2010)

At the closing of this vespers/liturgy is a modified artoklasia at which bread, wine, and dates or figs are blessed and partaken of by the faithful as sustenance for the remainder of the fast. Thereafter is prescribed the reading of the Acts of the Apostles, which Saint John Chrysostom stated was the best proof of the Resurrection, and which is prescribed as the reading between vespers and matins at Sunday vigils for all of the fifty days of Pentecost.

In ancient times, the faithful would remain in the church throughout the night. The Paschal Vigil would have begun on the afternoon of Saturday and not ended until towards dawn on Sunday morning. In contemporary practice, there is typically a gap of some hours before this reading commences.

==== Saturday Midnight ====
The order of the Paschal Vigil is as follows (with some minor local variations):

1. After the reading of the Acts of the Apostles the Midnight Office is served "at the fourth hour of the night", generally, in practice, timed to end shortly before midnight, during which is sung again the Canon of Holy Saturday and are read commentaries of Saints Epiphanius of Cyprus and John Chrysostom.
  1. The epitaphios (shroud) depicting the dead body of Christ is solemnly venerated for a last time and then ceremoniously taken into the altar and laid on the Holy Table towards the end of the canon.
  2. After the dismissal of the midnight office all the lights in the church are extinguished except for the unsleeping flame on the Holy Table (altar), and all wait in silence and darkness. Where possible, the Holy Light arrives from the Holy Sepulchre during Holy Saturday afternoon and it is used to light anew the unsleeping flame.
2. At the "time for matins", usually in practice at the stroke of midnight, the priest censes around the Holy Table, and lights his candle from the unsleeping flame. The Holy Doors are opened, after which the priest exclaims "Come receive the light from the light that is never overtaken by night, and glorify Christ, Who is risen from the dead!" or a similar variation depending on tradition. After this proclamation, the priest approaches the congregation with the Paschal trikirion (lit from the unsleeping flame), and the people light their candles from the flame.
3. Two vessels of incense, one in the altar, the other in the middle of the church, are lit. The priest takes the blessing cross and the deacon a candle, and other priests take the Gospel Book and icon of the Resurrection, and process westward, opening the doors of the nave and the exterior doors and together with the people exit the church and go in procession three times around it while singing the hymn of the resurrection: "Thy resurrection, O Christ our Saviour, the angels sing in the heavens, and us on earth make worthy to glorify Thee with pure hearts" during which the church bells ring incessantly. This procession recounts the journey of the Myrrhbearers to the Tomb of Christ. During and after the procession, the priest carries a special triple candlestick, known as the Paschal trikirion, and the deacon also carries a special Paschal candle. The candles lit at midnight are held by the people throughout the entire liturgy, just as is done by the newly baptized.
4. Before the front doors of the church, the priest gives the blessing for the beginning of Matins. The clergy, followed by the people, sing the Paschal troparion with the Paschal Verses, and the Paschal greeting "Christ is risen!" "Truly He is risen!" is exchanged for the first time. Then, everyone enters the church singing the troparion.
5. The rest of Matins is celebrated according to special Paschal rubrics. Everything in the liturgy is intended to be exultant and full of light. Nothing in the liturgy is read, but everything is sung joyfully. During the Paschal Canon, the priests cense the church, continually exchanging the Paschal greeting with the faithful. Towards the end of matins the Paschal Homily of St. John Chrysostom is proclaimed.
6. Eggs which have been dyed red are blessed and are usually distributed to the people for the breaking of the Great Lenten fast.
7. The Paschal Hours, which are of entirely different text than their usual order, are sung where it is the custom.
8. The Divine Liturgy of St. John Chrysostom is celebrated as usual, but with special features added that are unique to the Paschal season.
9. At the end of the liturgy, the Artos, a large loaf of leavened bread, which represents the Resurrected Christ, is blessed. This is then set next to the Icon of the Resurrection and is venerated by the faithful and carried in processions throughout Bright Week.
10. Baskets of food for the feast that follows are blessed with holy water.

The liturgy typically finishes at 3:00 or 4:00 a.m. There is no prescribed liturgy on Sunday morning, everything for the feast having been celebrated during the Vigil. On Sunday afternoon there is a special, Paschal Vespers, at which the Gospel (John 20:19–25) is chanted in many languages (called "Vespers of Love" in some traditions).

The week that begins on the Sunday of Pascha is called Bright Week, and is considered to be one continuous day. The Holy Doors of the iconostasis is left open from the moment they were opened at midnight throughout all of Bright Week, being closed only at the end of the Ninth Hour on Bright Saturday. Most of the unique features of the Paschal liturgies continue through the week and following the Liturgy there is a festive procession around the outside of the church every day and the entire week is a fast-free period, even on Wednesday and Friday, which are normally fast days throughout the year.

=== Indian Orthodox Church ===
In the Indian Orthodox Church the vigil begins in the evening after the liturgy on Good Friday. The faithful spend time in the church reading from the scriptures and singing hymns.

The church celebrates this most important festival in the church calendar, as per the Gregorian Calendar.

Traditionally, the principal liturgy which corresponds to the Easter Vigil in Eastern and Western rites would be conducted in the early hours of the morning, typically at around 3 a.m. on Sunday. In many cities, however, the liturgy is conducted after 6:00 p.m. on Saturday; this is also the case for practical reasons in former Christian lands of the Oriental Orthodox rite which now have Muslim majorities.

Easter marks the change in the set of prayers said and sung before the Eucharist. From Easter to the Feast of the Cross on September 14, the prayers follow the Liturgy of Easter.

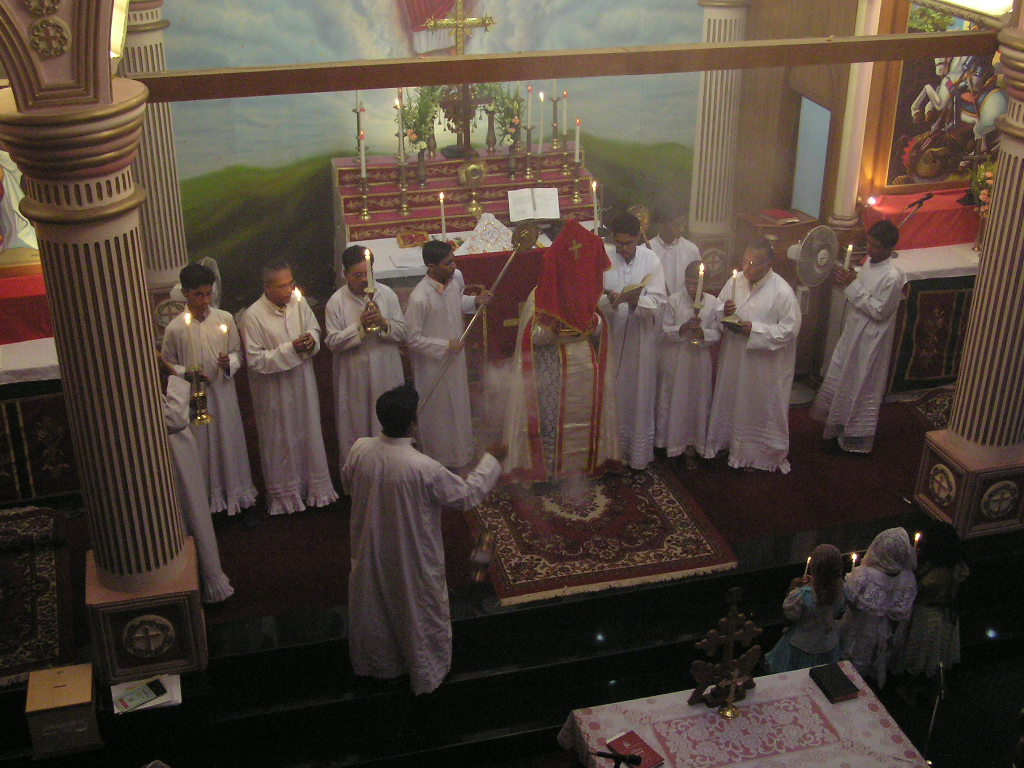
"News Of Great Joy!"

Traditionally the Prayers of the Night and Midnight Hours are said. Then follows the most dramatic moment in the liturgy, the Announcement, when all the lights in the church are extinguished other than from the Altar candles and those held by those serving at the altar. The veil separating the sanctuary from the congregation is drawn aside. The chief celebrant stands in the centre of the sanctuary, holding a cross covered in a red embroidered cloth.

This is the cross which has been used in the Good Friday liturgy for the procession commemorating the Carrying of the Cross to Calvary and then ritually embalmed and buried in a small coffin-shaped box behind the altar, to commemorate the Burial. The chief celebrant is flanked by the altar-servers, holding candles and hand-bells. In a loud voice, the chief celebrant announces to the congregation, "Dearly beloved, I bring you all news of great joy. Our Lord Jesus Christ has resurrected from the dead and defeated His enemies." Amid the ringing of the hand-bells and church-bells, the congregation responds, "Truly, we believe that He rises!" This is done three times.

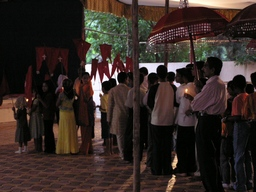
An Indian Orthodox Easter procession

The Easter Procession follows, in which the entire congregation, holding lighted candles, participates with the celebrants and the altar servers. The cross, covered in the red veil, used in the Announcement, is carried in procession around the church. The hymn sung during the procession describes Christ's answer to Mary Magdalene when she sees him at the tomb and mistakes him for the gardener:

O Mary! I am the Gardener truly,
I am the One, Who established Paradise.
I am the One Who was killed,
I am the One Who entered the grave.
Touch Me not, for I have not ascended to the Father.
That I have gloriously risen from that grave,
give thou this good news to the disciples.

Blessings from the Easter Cross

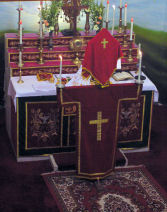
The Easter Cross on its stand in the sanctuary

Following this, the chief celebrant "celebrates" the Cross, by blessing the four directions while the Trisagion is said. The chief celebrant gives the Kiss of Peace, commemorating Christ's wishing peace on the Apostles. This is passed on to the congregation. On this day alone the Kiss of Peace is given twice. Prayers of the Morning hours follow, and the Holy Qurbana is then conducted as usual. Since Easter also marks the end of the Great 50-day Lent the Service of Reconciliation (Shubhkono) is also held on this day. Special prayers are said.

At the end of the liturgy, instead of the normal touching by the Chief Celebrant's hand of the foreheads of each member of the congregation in blessing, the Easter Cross is used.

From Easter to the Feast of Ascension, the Easter Cross is moved from the centre of the church to a stand inside the sanctuary. This stand, called Golgotha, is itself shaped as a large cross. The Easter Cross is set on its head, and the whole structure looks like a Patriarchal Cross. It had been set up in mid-Lent in the centre of the church and the faithful would kiss the cloth covering it while entering and leaving the church.

== Bibliography ==
- Тvпико́нъ сіесть уста́въ (Title here transliterated into Russian; actually in Church Slavonic) (The Typicon which is the Order), Москва (Moscow, Russian Empire): Сvнодальная тvпографiя (The Synodal Printing House), 1907, p. 1154
- Потребникъ (Title here transliterated into Russian; actually in Church Slavonic) (The [Book of] Needs), Москва (Moscow, Russian Empire): патриархальная тvпографiя (The Patriarchal Printing Press), 1606
- The Lenten Triodion, translated from the Original Greek by Mother Mary and Archimandrite Kallistos Ware, South Canaan, Pennsylvania, USA: Saint Tikhon's Seminary Press (published 1987), 1978, p. 193, ISBN 1-878997-51-3
- Sokolof, Archpriest Dimitrii (1899), Manual of the Orthodox Church's Divine Services, Jordanville, New York: Holy Trinity Monastery (published 2001), pp. 132–136, ISBN 0-88465-067-7
- Ware, Timothy (1963), The Orthodox Church, London, UK: Penguin Books (published 1987), p. 193, ISBN 978-0-14-013529-9
