= Easter Saturday =

Saturday six days after Easter Sunday

- Observed by: Christendom
- Type: Christian
- Observances: church services
- Date: seventh day of Eastertide
- 2025 date: April 26 (Western Churches); April 26 (Eastern Churches)
- 2026 date: April 11 (Western Churches); April 18 (Eastern Churches)
- 2027 date: April 3 (Western Churches); May 8 (Eastern Churches)
- 2028 date: April 22 (Western Churches); April 22 (Eastern Churches)

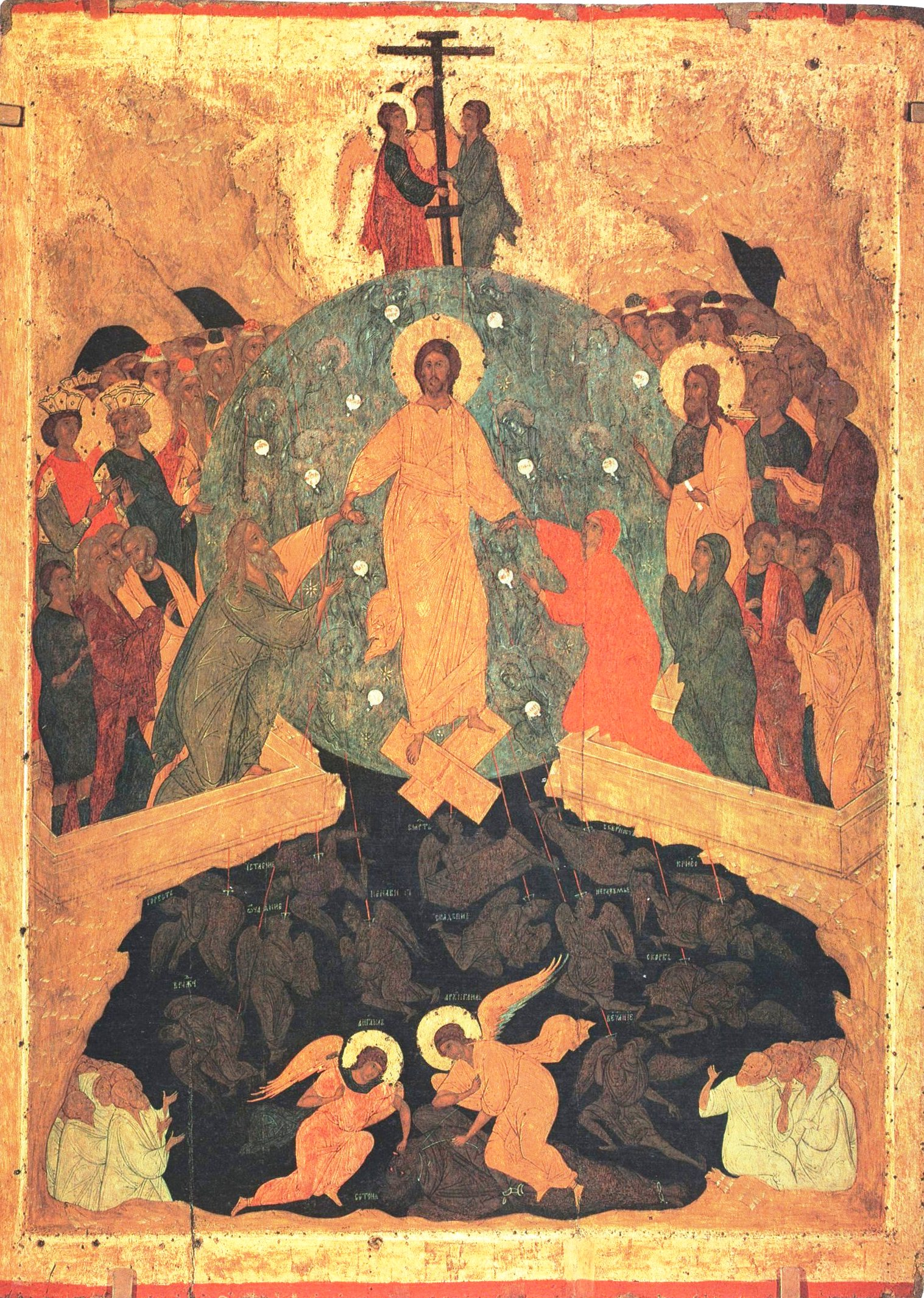
Russian Orthodox icon of the Resurrection, by Dionisius, 15th century (State Russian Museum, Saint Petersburg)

Easter Saturday, on the Christian calendar, is the seventh day of Eastertide, being the Saturday of Easter or Bright Week. In the kalendar of Western Christianity it is the last day of Easter Week, sometimes referred to as the Saturday of Easter Week or Saturday in Easter Week. It is the seventh day in the Octave of Easter too. In the liturgy of Eastern Christianity it is the last day of Bright Week, and called Bright Saturday, The Bright and Holy Septave Saturday of Easter Eve, or The Bright and Holy Septave Paschal Artos and Octoechoes Saturday of Iscariot's Byzantine Easter Eve. Easter Saturday is the day preceding the Second Sunday of Easter (also known as St. Thomas Sunday or Divine Mercy Sunday).

== Terminology ==
Easter Saturday refers to the first Saturday of Eastertide, that is, the Saturday that follows Easter Sunday. The term Easter Saturday is also used colloquially to refer to Holy Saturday – a week before the religious holiday of Easter Saturday, probably because of references to the Easter weekend. Many people, especially religious authorities, regard this alternative meaning as inaccurate, but it remains in common Australian usage. The use of the term "Bright Saturday" avoids this confusion by clearly referring to the Saturday 6 days after Easter Sunday.

== Eastern Christianity ==
In the Eastern Orthodox Church and those Eastern Catholic Churches which follow the Byzantine Rite, this day is known as "Bright Saturday", and is the last day of Bright Week. All of the services for Pascha (Easter) are repeated every day of Bright Week (Easter Week), except for the hymns from the Octoechos. On Bright Friday, the Resurrection hymns from the Octoechos are taken from Tone Eight. Before the dismissal of Matins a crucession (procession headed by the cross) takes place, going three times around the outside of the temple (church building), while chanting the Paschal Canon (in parish churches, this crucession often takes place after the Divine Liturgy).

On this day, the Paschal Artos, a large loaf of leavened bread which was blessed at the end of the Paschal Vigil on Pascha (early Easter Sunday morning), is broken and distributed to the faithful. This may either be done at the end of the Divine Liturgy, and given out along with the antidoron, or it may be broken at trapeza (refectory) before the festal meal.

According to the Supplemental Book of Needs, the fracturing of the Artos is done in this way: "After the Divine Liturgy, the Artos is carried, as is customary, to the Trapeza and "Christ is risen..." is sung three times, with reverences, and after "Our Father" has been said, and having blessed the food as usual, the Deacon says: "Let us pray to the Lord", and the Brethren respond "Lord, have mercy", the Priest says the following prayer over the Artos: “O Lord Jesus Christ our God, the angelic Bread, the Bread of life eternal, Who came down from heaven and nourished us on these brightest days with the spiritual food of Thy divine benefactions for the sake of Thy three-day saving Resurrection, also now look down, we humbly pray Thee, upon our prayers and thanksgivings, and as Thou didst bless the five loaves in the wilderness, do now bless this bread, that all who eat of it may be granted corporal and spiritual blessings and health, through the grace and compassion of Thy love for mankind. For Thou art our sanctification, and unto Thee do we send up glory, together with Thine Unoriginate Father, and Thine All-holy, Good and Life-creating Spirit, now and ever, and unto ages of ages. The Brethren: Amen. Having fractured the Artos as is customary, he distributes it to everyone before the meal"

The Holy Doors in the iconostasis, which have remained open all of Bright Week are closed on this day before the beginning of the Ninth Hour. The Vespers (or All-Night Vigil, depending upon local usage) on Saturday night is chanted in the normal manner, rather than the Paschal manner. However, the Paschal troparion "Christ is risen..." is read (or chanted, if a Vigil) three times at the beginning. That Vespers is the beginning of Thomas Sunday.

Because the date of Pascha is moveable, Bright Saturday is a part of the Paschal cycle, and changes from year to year. Eastern Christianity calculates the date of Easter differently from the West (see Computus for details).

== Western Christianity ==
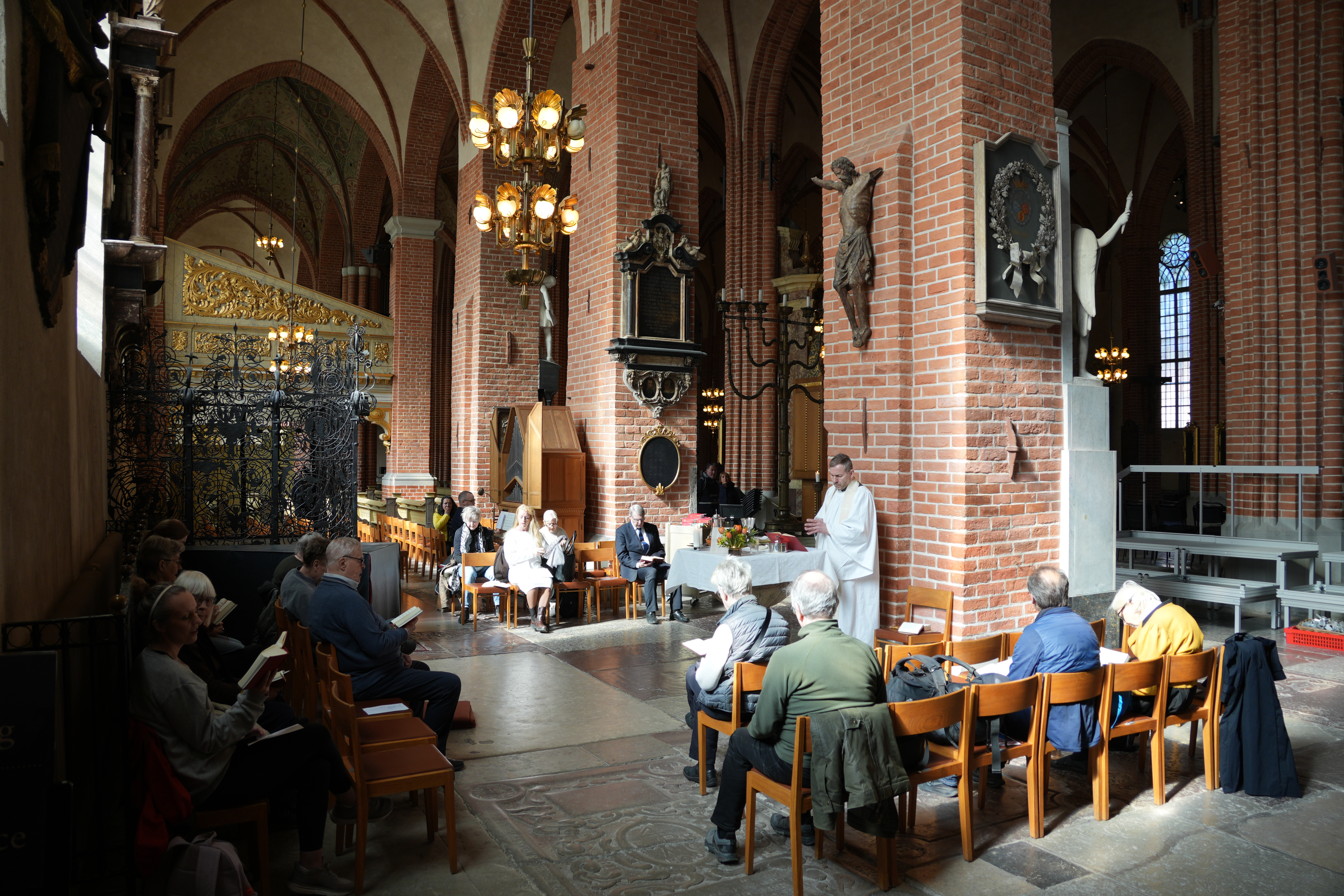
An Evangelical-Lutheran priest celebrates the Mass in the Saint Olaus Petri Chapel of Saint Nicholas Cathedral (Stockholm) on Easter Saturday

In Western Christianity, Easter Saturday is the seventh day of Eastertide, as well as the seventh day in the Octave of Easter.

In the Lutheran churches, the Gospel for Easter Saturday concerns St. John's account of the resurrection of Jesus.

In Western Christianity, the earliest day Easter Saturday can fall on is March 28 (as in 1818 and 2285). The latest date this can occur is May 1 (as in 1943 and 2038)

== See also ==
- Easter Monday
- Easter Tuesday
- Easter Friday
