= Christos anesti =

Christos Anesti ("Χριστὸς ἀνέστη" - "Christ is Risen!") may refer to:

- Paschal greeting, used by Christians during the Resurrection/Passover season
- Paschal troparion, a hymn in the Eastern Orthodox Church
