= Ypakoe =

The Ypakoë (also, Hypakoë, Greek: Ύπακοή, from the verb `υπακούω, "hearken" or "give ear", to "respond"; Slavonic: Ѵпакои) is a troparion chanted at Orthros (Matins) and the Midnight Office on Great Feasts and Sundays throughout the liturgical year in the Eastern Orthodox Church. The Ypakoë which is chanted on Sundays is found in the Octoechos and there are eight of them, according to the Tone of the Week. The Ypakoë used at one of the Great Feasts will be written in the tone of the hymnographer's choice.

The Ypakoë, as its name suggests, illustrates the theme of being sent to proclaim the Gospel; and in particular the Resurrection of Jesus by the Myrrh-bearers (Sundays and Pascha) or the theme of the particular Feast being celebrated.

The hymn occurs in several places, depending upon the day and the service:

- On some Great Feasts it is chanted at Matins after the Little Litany which follows Canticle Three of the Canon of the Feast. Not all of the Great Feasts have an Ypakoë; sometimes, a different troparion, called a Sessional Hymn occurs at this point.
- On Sundays at Matins, it is chanted after the Kathismata (readings from the Psalter)—specifically, after the Evlogitaria of the Resurrection and the Little Litany.
- On Sundays at the Midnight Office it is read after the "Canon to the Most Holy Trinity" (this is the same Ypakoë that is chanted after the Kathismata)
- At Pascha (Easter), in addition to its place after the Third Ode of Matins, it is chanted again during the Paschal Hours and the Divine Liturgy along with the Paschal troparion and kontakion.

== Examples ==
Sunday (Tone 5)

The myrrh-bearing women, their minds dazzled by the sight of the angel and their souls enlightened by Thy divine Resurrection, preached the good tidings to the Apostles: "O spread among the nation the news of the Resurrection of the Lord, He, Who works wonders and grants us His great mercy."

Nativity of Christ (Tone 8)
:

Calling the Magi by a star, heaven brought the first fruits of the Gentiles unto Thee, a Babe lying in the manger: and they were amazed to see neither sceptre nor throne but only utter poverty. For what is meaner than swaddling clothes? Yet therein shone forth the wealth of Thy divinity: Glory to Thee, O Lord!

Pascha (Tone 8)

Before the dawn, Mary and the women came and found the stone rolled away from the tomb. They heard the angelic voice: "Why do ye seek among the dead, as a mortal man, the One Who is Everlasting Light? Behold the clothes in the grave! Go, and proclaim to the world: The Lord is risen! He hath slain death, as He is the Son of God, saving the race of man."

In 1997, Sir Nicholas Goodison of the City of London Festival commissioned English composer and Orthodox Christian John Tavener to write a piece for the festival. He wrote a suite for solopiano, entitled, Ypakoë, based on the Ypakoë of Pascha. It was premiered at the 1999 Festival by Venezuelan pianist Elena Riu (daughter of Catalan philosopher Federico Riu). The work is a 20-minute meditation on the Passion and Resurrection of Christ. The composer has described the piece as "a totally spiritual concept – to atune the individual’s (performer’s or listener’s) will to the divine will."
