= Artos =

Easter bread

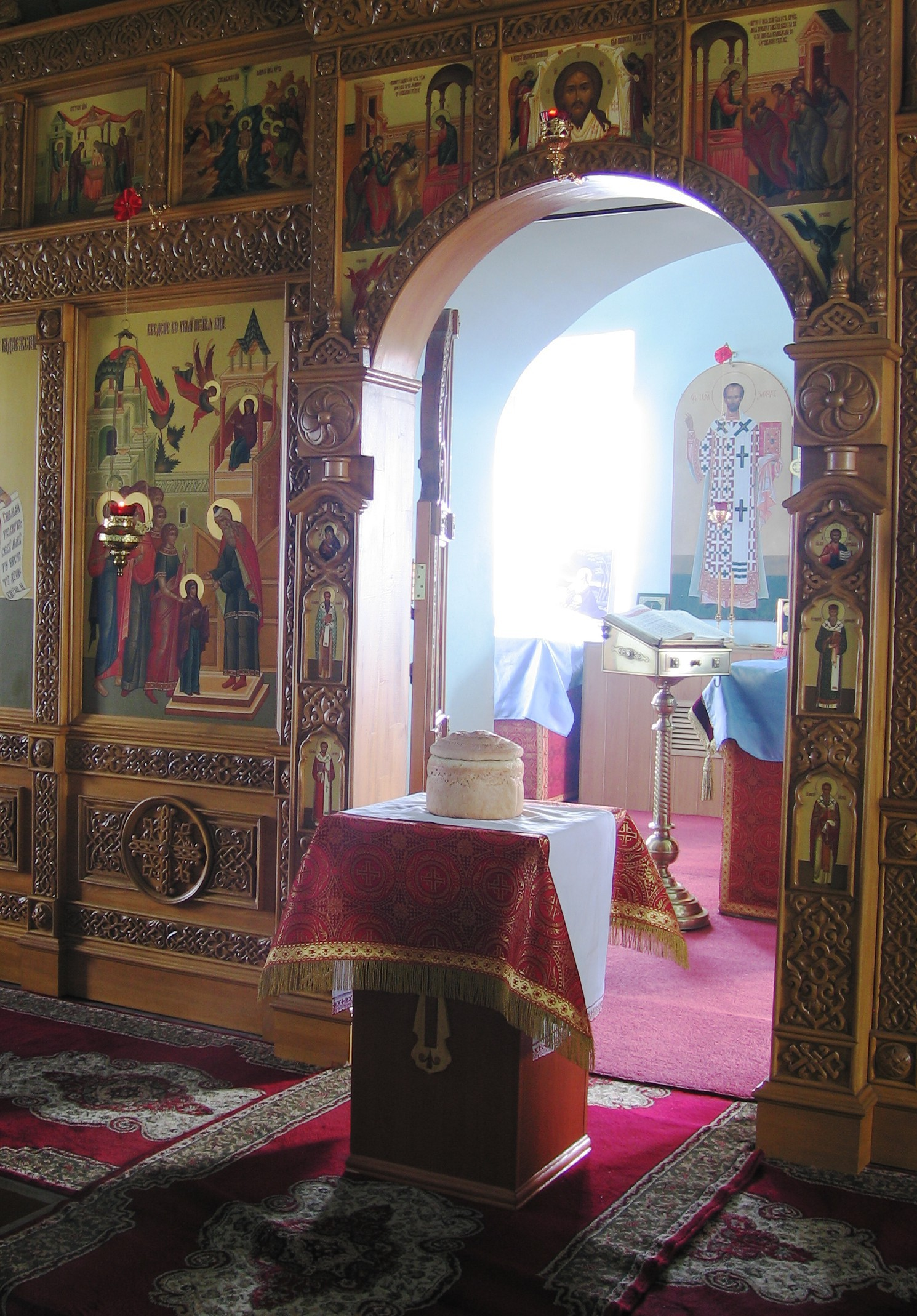
Paschal Artos, between services during bright Week, in front of opened royal doors.

An artos (Ancient Greek: ἄρτος, "leavened loaf", "bread") is a loaf of leavened bread that is blessed during services in the Eastern Orthodox and Byzantine rite catholic churches. A large Artos is baked with a seal depicting the resurrection for use at Pascha (Easter). Smaller loaves are blessed during great vespers in a ritual called Artoklasia and in other occasions like feast days, weddings, memorial services etc.

== Etymology ==
Artos in Ancient Greek meant "cake", "loaf of wheat-bread", collectively "bread", but in Modern Greek it is now more commonly used in the context of communion bread used in church, having been replaced in the broader context by the word ψωμί, psomi. (Note: Put in another way, artos in modern Greek is a high-register word, used more, apart from the aforementioned ecclesiastical settings, in Katharevousa or relevant contexts. On the other hand it is commonly found inside common compound words like αρτοποιός, "baker", and αρτοποιείο, "bakery".) This word is thought to be first attested in Mycenaean Greek as the first stem of the compound word 𐀀𐀵𐀡𐀦, a-to-po-qo, "bakers", written in the Linear b syllabary. (Note: Identified as ἀρτοπόκοι, artopokoi, plural of ἀρτοπόκος, artopokos. Found on the MY Au 102, PY An 39, PY Fn 50, PY An 427, tablets; MY Oe 117 reads a-to-po-qo-i (DAT plural). In later Greek only ἀρτοπόπος, artopopos, and ἀρτοκόπος are attested, therefore there has been some criticism over this identification. Palaeolexicon cites 𐀀𐀵, a-to by itself (not as part of a compound word), as the attested form of the word.) (Note: 𐀀𐀵, a-to, is also found outside a compound word (KN As 40 tablet), but in this case, it does not stand for ἄρτος-bread; it is instead read, by scholars, as an unrelated anthroponym (Cf. Ἄνθος).)

== Paschal Artos ==
=== Ritual ===
Near the end of the Paschal Vigil, after the Prayer Before the Ambo, a single large loaf of bread, the Artos, is brought to the priest. Depicted on the top of the Artos are either the symbol of Christ's victory over death—the Cross, surmounted by a crown of thorns—or the Resurrection of Christ. The Artos symbolizes the physical presence of the resurrected Christ among the disciples. The priest blesses the Artos with a special prayer and sprinkles it with Holy Water. The Artos is then placed on a small table before the Iconostasis where it remains throughout Bright Week. It is customary, whenever the faithful enter the Temple, for them to kiss the Artos as a way of greeting the Risen Christ. On every day of Bright Week, after the Paschal Divine Liturgy (or, alternatively, after Paschal Matins), the Artos is carried in a solemn procession around the outside of the church.

In monasteries, the Artos is carried to the Trapeza every day of Bright Week, where at the end of the festive meal, it is lifted in a ceremony called the Lifting of the Artos. (Note: Cf. Lifting of the Panagia.) The one performing the ceremony will lift up the Artos (symbolizing Christ's Resurrection) and say, "Christ is Risen!" All will respond, "He is truly Risen!" The celebrant will then make the sign of the Cross with the Artos as he says, "We worship His Resurrection on the third day!" Then two Paschal hymns are sung and everyone comes forward to kiss the Artos and receive the Superior's blessing, as all sing the Paschal troparion many times.

On Bright Saturday, after the Divine Liturgy, the priest says another prayer over the Artos and it is then broken and distributed among the whole congregation along with the Antidoron. (Note: Alternatively, the Artos may be carried to the Trapeza, where the prayer is said and everyone partakes of it before the common meal. Sometimes, in parishes, the priest will wait until after the Liturgy on Thomas Sunday to break and distribute the Artos.)

=== Significance ===
The significance of the artos is that it serves to remind all Christians of the events connected with the Resurrection of Our Lord Jesus Christ. While still living on earth, the Lord called Himself the Bread of Life, saying: I am the bread of life; he who comes to Me shall not hunger, and He who believes in Me shall never thirst (John 6:35). After His Resurrection, more than once Jesus appeared to His disciples, ate before them and blessed their own food. For example, as evening fell on the first day of His Resurrection, He was recognized in Emmaus by two of His disciples as He blessed and broke bread (Luke 24:13–35).

On the 40th day after His Resurrection, the Lord ascended into heaven, and His disciples and followers found comfort in their memories of the Lord: they recalled His every word, His every step and His every action. When they met for common prayer, they would partake of the Body and Blood of Christ, remembering the Last Supper. When they sat down to an ordinary meal, they would leave a place at the head of the table empty for the invisibly present Lord and would lay bread on that place.

Remembering this custom of the Apostles, the Fathers of the Church made it their custom to put out the Artos at the Paschal Feast in memory of the appearances of the Risen Lord to His disciples, and also in memory of the fact that the Lord Who suffered and was resurrected for our justification has made Himself the true Bread of Life and is invisibly present in His church always, to the close of the age (Matthew 28:20).

The Artos may also be compared to the unleavened bread of the Old Testament, which the people of ancient Israel, after being delivered from their captivity in the land of Egypt, ate during the week of the Passover (Ex. 12:15-20). As Cyril, Bishop of Turov, who lived during the 12th Century in Kievan Rus', said in a sermon for the Sunday after Pascha:

Even as the Jews bore the unleavened bread upon their heads out of Egypt through the desert (Exodus 12:34) until they had crossed the Red Sea, after which they dedicated the bread to God, divided it amongst all their host, and having all eaten thereof, became...terrible to their enemies, even so do we, saved by our Resurrected Lord from the captivity of that Pharaoh of the mind, the Devil, bear forth the blessed bread the Artos from the day of the Resurrection of Christ and, finally, having dedicated this bread to God, we eat of it and preserve it to the health of body and soul.

It is a custom among Russian Orthodox Christians to this day to keep a portion of the artos throughout the year and with due reverence and faith to eat of it in time of illness or distress. This is eaten, often together with a drink of Holy Water, which had been blessed at the Feast of the Theophany of Our Lord.

== Artoklasia ==
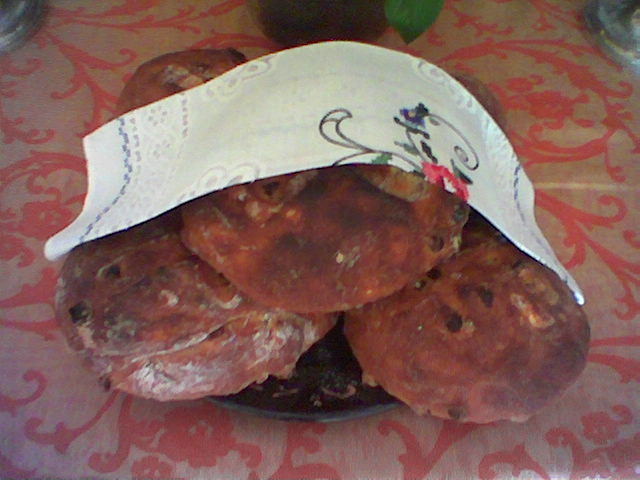
Loaves prepared for Artoklasia.

On feast days towards the end of vespers there is a blessing of loaves, (Note: Five loaves are a common custom, reminiscent of the miracle of the feeding of the multitude (Matthew 14:17, etc.).) wheat, wine, and oil, whereafter the priest breaks one of the loaves from which action the rite receives its name: Artoklasia, "breaking of bread".

The loaves for the Artoklasia may be sealed (before baking) with a stamp (as are the Prosphora for the Divine Liturgy); such a seal may have an Icon of a saint on it, or it may be a simple cross—perhaps inscribed with a prayer on it, such as "May the Blessing of the Lord be upon us. Amen." (Note: A similar Artoklasia is performed at the end of the Vesperal Divine Liturgy on Great Saturday, except that oil and wheat are not blessed, but only the five loaves and a cup of wine. This Artoklasia is a remnant from the days when the faithful would not leave the church all day on Great Saturday, but wait in prayerful anticipation for the beginning of the Paschal Vigil. Each person would be given bread, dried fruit, and a cup of wine as all listened to the reading of the Acts of the Apostles.)

== See also ==
- Bread in Ancient Greek Cuisine
- Prosphora
- Artoklasia

== Notes and references ==
Notes
