= Paschal Hours =

Form for chanting the Little Hours at Easter

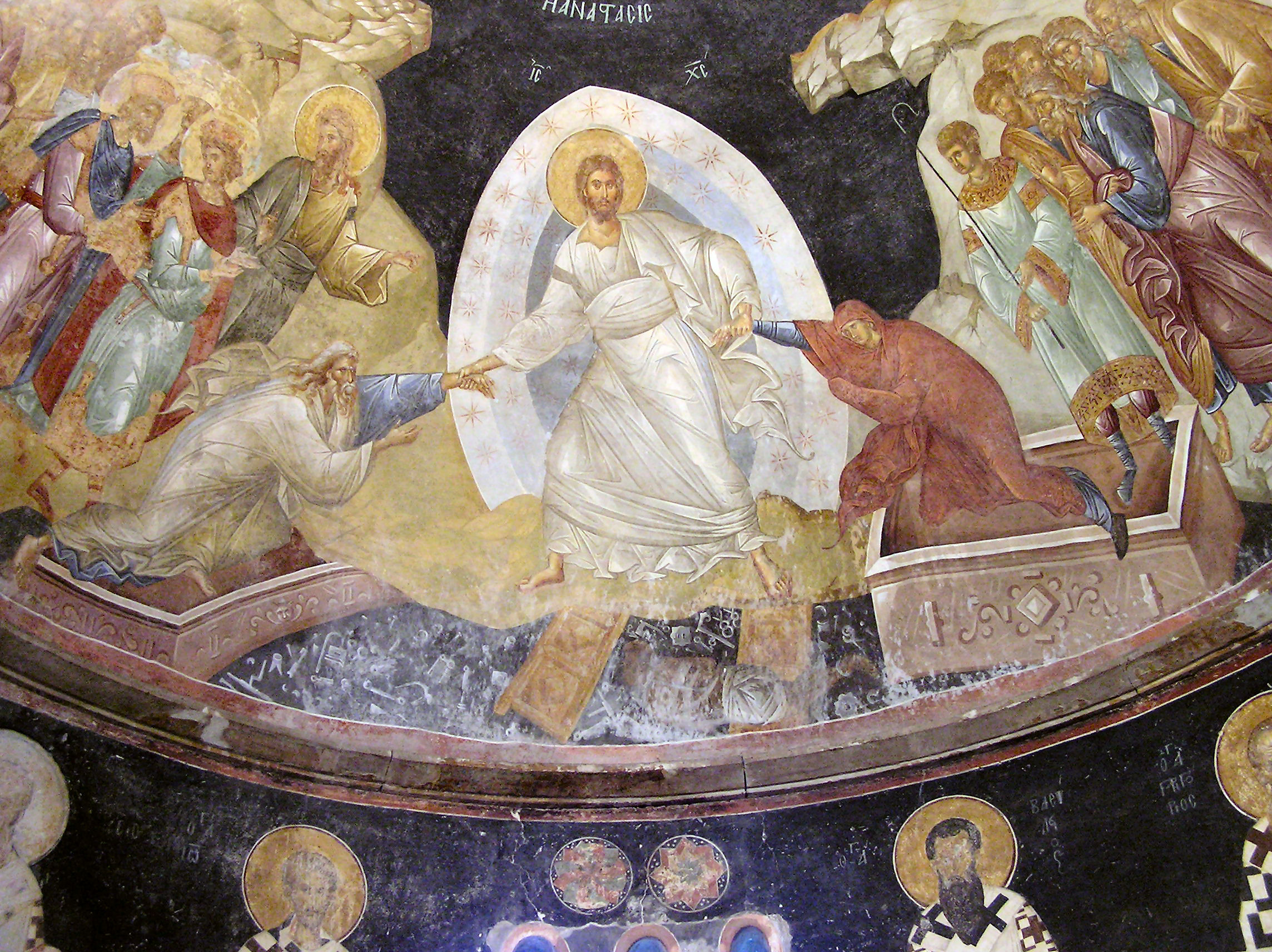
Icon of the Resurrection (fresco from the Chora Church, Istanbul).

The Paschal Hours are the form in which the Little Hours are chanted on Pascha (Easter) and throughout Bright Week in the Eastern Orthodox and Byzantine Catholic churches.

Specifically, the Paschal Hours replace:

- Compline
- The Midnight Office
- The First Hour
- The Third and Sixth Hours
- The Ninth Hour

The Paschal Hours may also be chanted in place of the usual Thanksgiving after Communion. In addition, it is a pious tradition to substitute the Paschal Hours for Morning Prayers and Evening Prayers during all of Bright week.

In this way, the faithful take a little rest from the long prayer services, but do not neglect to give joyous thanks to God, so as not to fall into despondency and gluttony, as they partake of festive foods.

== Outline ==
The Paschal Hours differ from the normal Daily Office in several significant aspects: the entire service is chanted (sung) rather than being read; the services are much shorter than usual; and there are no Psalms at all.

The hymnography and prayers center on Christ's victory over sin and death and Christians' hope for salvation.

- Opening blessing
- Troparion of Pascha (thrice)
- Having beheld the Resurrection of Christ, let us worship the holy Lord Jesus, the only sinless One. We venerate your Cross, O Christ, and we praise and glorify your holy Resurrection; for you are our God and we know no other than you and we call upon your Name. Come all you faithful, let us venerate Christ's holy Resurrection, for behold through the Cross joy has come into all the world. Let us ever bless the Lord, praising his Resurrection, for enduring the Cross for us, he has destroyed death by death. (thrice)
- Hypakoe of Pascha: Before the dawn the Mary and the women came and found the stone roled away from the tomb. They heard the angel's voice, "Why do you seek among the dead as a man, the One who is everlasting Light? Behold, the clothes in the grave. Go and proclaim to the world: The Lord is risen, he has slain death as he is the Son of God, saving the human race.
- Kontakion of Pascha: You descended into the tomb, O Immortal, you destroyed the power of death. You arose in triumph, O Christ God, proclaiming, "Rejoice" to the myrrh-bearing women, granting peace to your apostles and giving resurrection to the fallen.
- Troparia:
  - In the tomb with the body and in Hades with the soul, in Paradise with the thief and on the throne with the Father and the Spirit, were You, O boundless Christ filling all things.
  - Glory to the Father and to the Son and to the Holy Spirit
  - Bearing life and more fruitful than Paradise, brighter than any royal chamber, Your tomb, O Christ, is the fountain of our resurrection.
  - Both now and ever and unto the ages of ages. Amen.
  - Rejoice, O holy and divine abode of the Most High, for through you, O Theotokos, joy is given to those who cry: Blessed are you among women, O all-undefiled Lady.
- Lord, have mercy (40 times)
- Blessing by priest
- Troparion of Pascha (thrice)
- Lord, have mercy (thrice)
- Dismissal

Each of the Paschal Hours is the same (except that in some traditions, a Prayer of St. Basil is added before the dismissal of Paschal Compline).
