= Bright Week =

Seven days beginning on Easter in Eastern Christianity

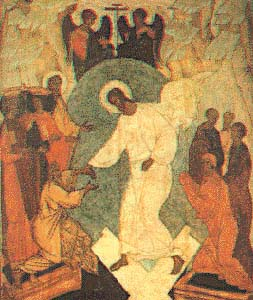
Russian Orthodox icon of the Resurrection of Jesus Christ depicting his descent into Hades, 16th century.

Bright Week, "Pascha Week" or "Renewal Week" (Greek: Διακαινήσιμος Ἑβδομάς) is the name used by the Eastern Orthodox and Byzantine Rite Catholic Churches for the period of seven days beginning on Easter and continuing up to (but not including) the following Sunday, which is known as Thomas Sunday.

The entire week following Easter is to be set aside by Orthodox Christians for the celebration of the Resurrection. According to the 66th canon of the Council in Trullo:

"from the holy day of the Resurrection of Christ our God until New Sunday (i.e. Thomas Sunday) for a whole week the faithful in the holy churches should continually be repeating psalms, hymns and spiritual songs, rejoicing and celebrating Christ, and attending to the reading of the Divine Scriptures and delighting in the Holy Mysteries. For in this way shall we be exalted with Christ; raised up together with Him. For this reason on the aforesaid days that by no means there be any horse races or any other public spectacle".

In Imperial Russia taverns were closed during Bright Week, and no alcoholic beverages were sold.

== Liturgical aspects ==
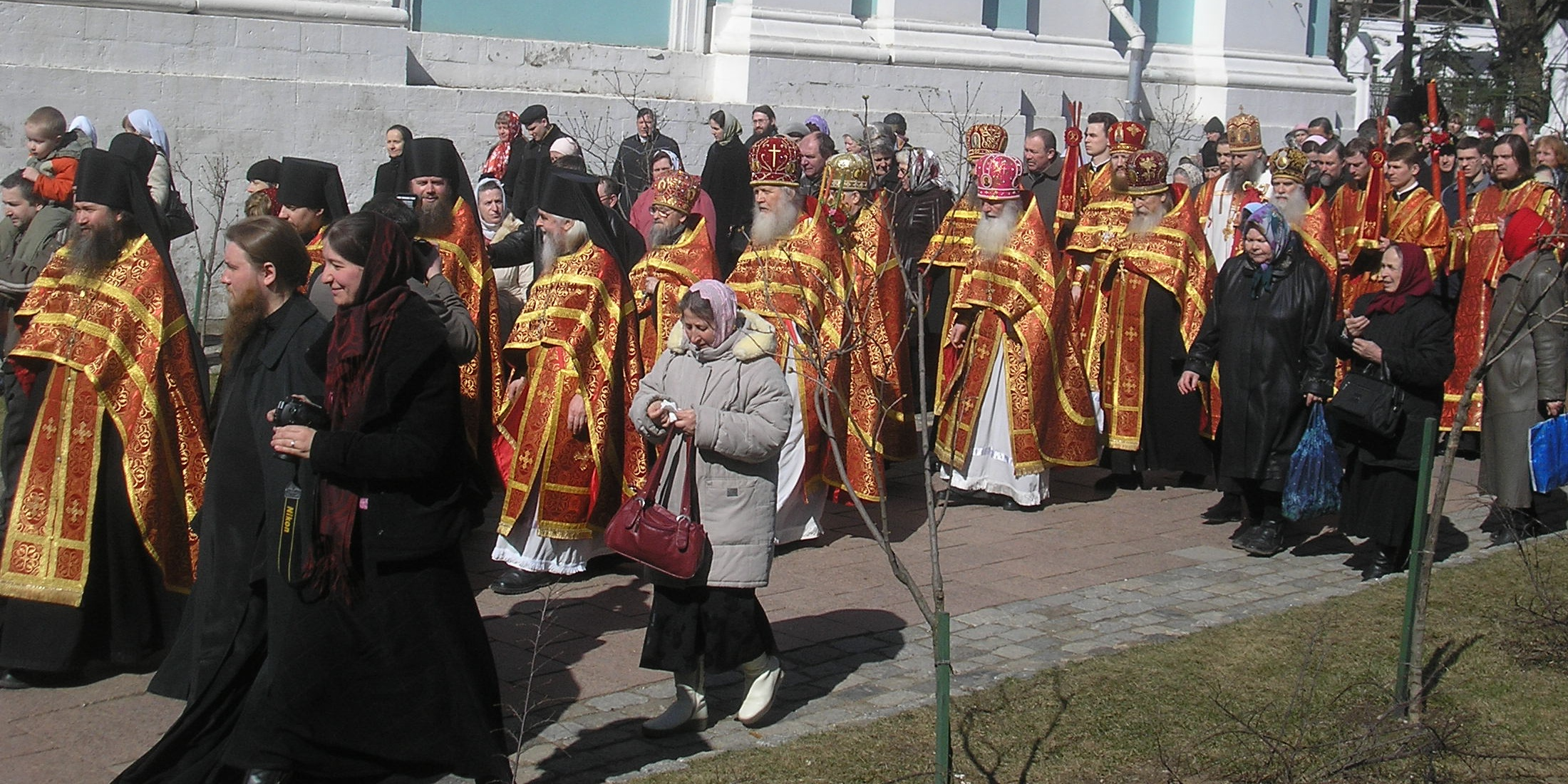
Priests in a Bright Week procession (The Trinity Lavra, in Sergiyev Posad, Russia).

The entire week is considered to be one continuous day. The name of each day of the week is called "Bright" (e.g., "Bright Monday") and the week's services are unique, varying greatly from those during the remainder of the year. The services are entirely sung, and the Paschal hymns are included with the stichera taken from the Sunday Resurrection propers in the Octoechos, rotating through the various tones. Tone 1 is used Holy Saturday and at Paschal matins on Sunday, tone 2 Sunday night and Monday, etc., skipping the least festive heavy (or grave) tone and ending with the plagal 4th (aka, Tone 8) on Friday night and Saturday.

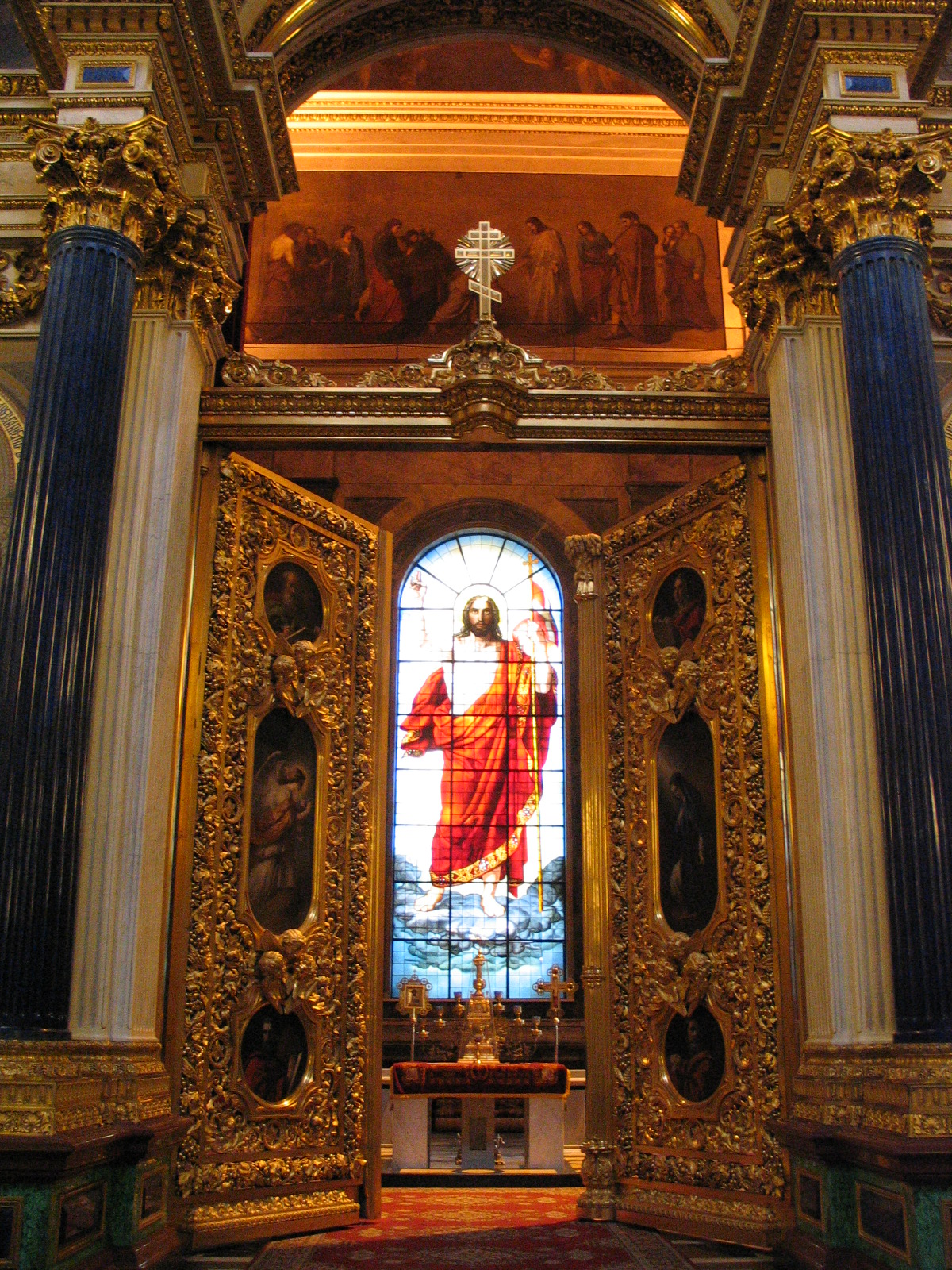
The sanctuary, seen through the open Holy Doors during Bright Week. The epitaphios (deep red) is visible on the Holy Table (St. Isaac's Cathedral, St. Petersburg).

During all of Bright Week the Holy Doors on the Iconostasis are kept open—the only time of the year when this occurs. The open doors represent the stone rolled away from the Tomb of Christ, and the Epitaphios (Slavonic: Plashchanitza), representing the burial clothes, is visible through them on the Holy Table (altar). The doors are closed before the Ninth Hour on the eve of Thomas Sunday. However, the Afterfeast of Pascha will continue until the eve of the Ascension.

During Bright Week the Paschal Verses (from Psalm 67) are sung responsorially with the Paschal troparion at the beginning of the Divine Liturgy, in place of Psalm 103 at the beginning of vespers and in place of the Six Psalms at the beginning of matins. Everything in the services is sung joyfully rather than read. Thus, for example, while censing the church before the Divine Liturgy, the deacon recites a Paschal hymn in place of Psalm 50. Normally, the entire Psalter is read during the course of a week (and twice a week during Great Lent), but during Bright Week no psalms at all are read. Each of the Little Hours is replaced by a special service known as the Paschal Hours. In Bright Week ordinary fasting is suspended, and the entire week is fast-free, with special Paschal foods eaten every day as well as red Easter eggs blessed during the Paschal Vigil.

At the end of the Divine Liturgy on Bright Monday through Bright Saturday there is an outdoor procession three times around the church, at which the Icon of the Resurrection and the Artos are carried. On the last circuit, there is a reading from the Gospel and the priest sprinkles the faithful with holy water.

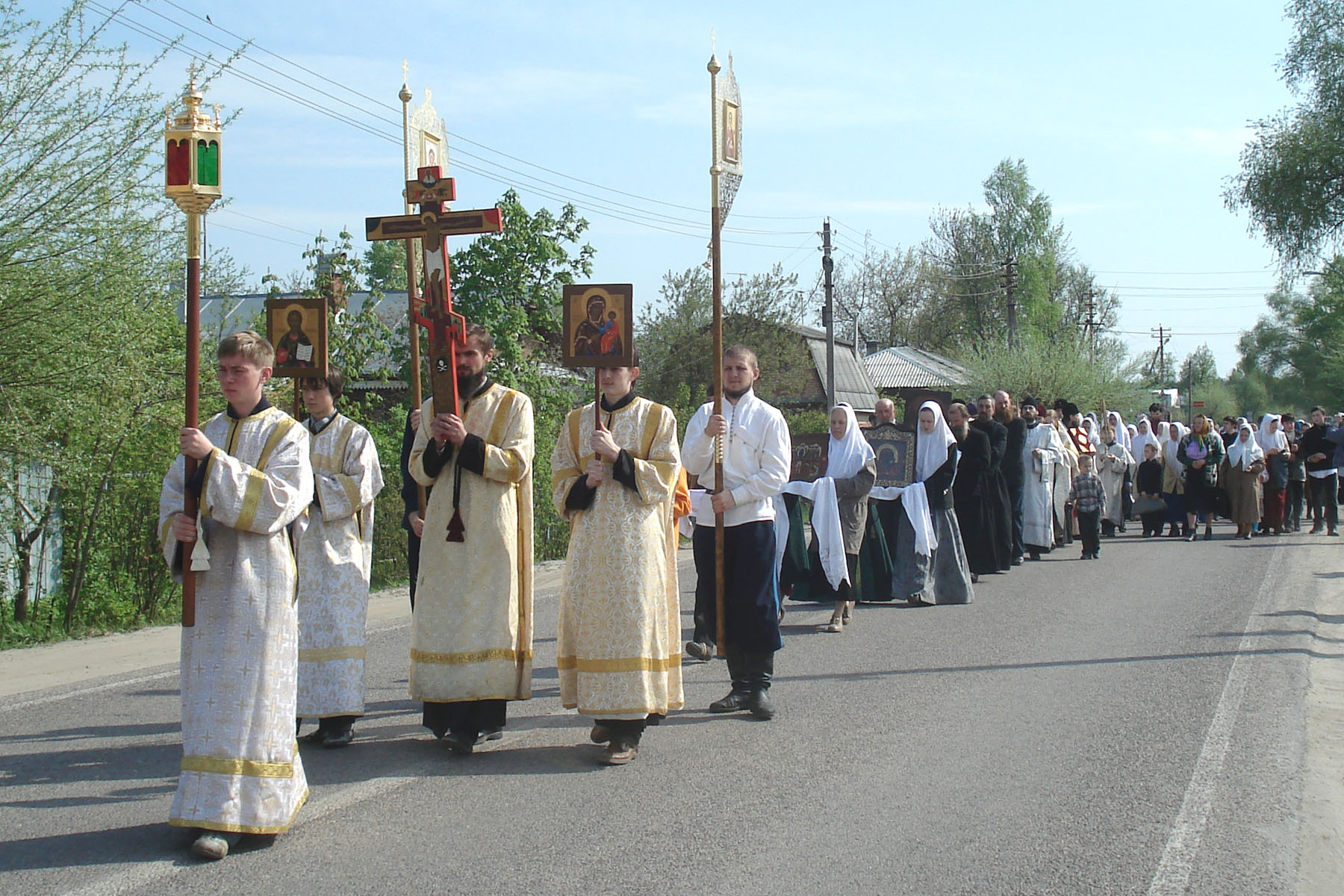
Bright Week procession (Russian Orthodox Old-Rite Church in Guslitsa)

The Artos is a loaf of leavened bread impressed before baking with a seal of an icon of the Resurrection that is blessed during the Paschal Vigil. This seal symbolizes the physical presence of the Resurrected Christ among the Apostles. This Artos is kept in the church during Bright Week, and may be placed either in the nave next to the Icon of the Resurrection, in front of the Icon of Christ on the Iconostasis, or in front of the Holy Doors. Throughout the week, whenever anyone enters the church, he or she kisses the Artos, symbolically greeting the resurrected Christ.

On Bright Friday, a service in honor of the Theotokos (Mother of God) as the "Life-giving Spring" is included in the Paschal service. This service is not found in the Typicon, but was composed in the fourteenth century by Nikita Kallistos Xanthopoulos, in commemoration of the renewal, i.e., the consecration of the temple known as the Life-giving Spring.

On Bright Saturday, after the Divine Liturgy, the priest says a prayer over the Artos and it is broken up and distributed to the faithful.

Bright Week begins the liturgical season known as the Pentecostarion, the period of fifty days which begins on Pascha and continues to Pentecost and its Afterfeast. The date of Pascha determines liturgical cycles as well as the Epistle and Gospel readings for the subsequent year.

== Paschal funeral and paraklesis ==
Funeral services held during Bright Week have a special rite, consisting entirely of joyous Paschal hymns with only the litanies remaining funereal. Parakleses (Molebens) during Pascha are likewise served according to a special rite, with the canon of Pascha.
