= Midnight office =

Canonical Hours

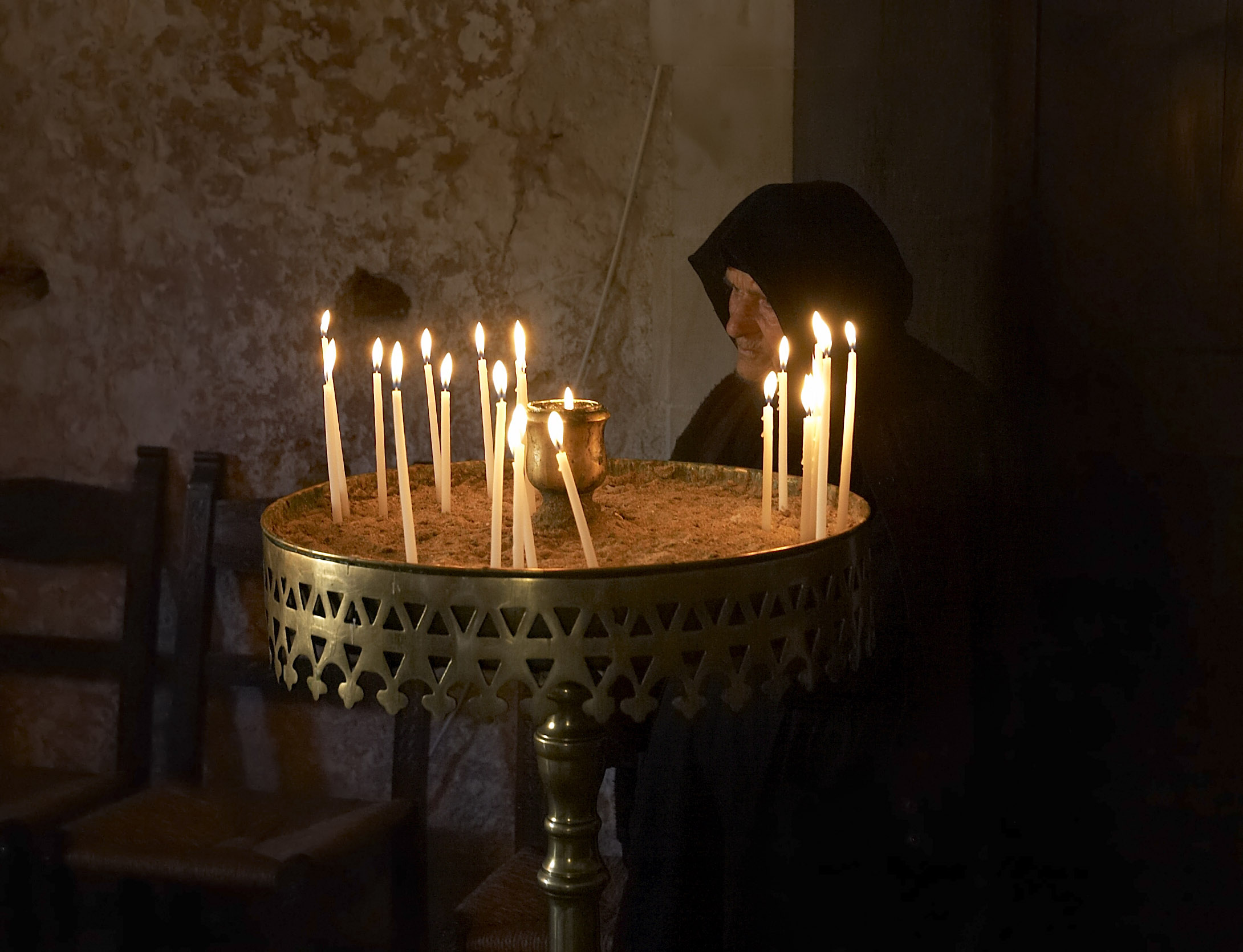
Moni Arkadiou (Arkadi Monastery). Candles in the church.

The Midnight Office (Greek: Μεσονυκτικόν, Mesonyktikón; Slavonic: Полу́нощница, Polúnoshchnitsa; Romanian: Miezonoptică) is one of the Canonical Hours that compose the cycle of daily worship in Eastern Christianity, including the Byzantine Rite, West Syriac Rite, East Syriac Rite and Alexandrian Rite. The office originated as a purely monastic devotion inspired by Psalm 118:62, At midnight I arose to give thanks unto Thee for the judgments of Thy righteousness (LXX), and also by the Gospel Parable of the Wise and Foolish Virgins (Matthew 25:1–13).

The name of the Midnight Office is sometimes translated as "Nocturns"; but this is misleading, as in the West "Nocturn" refers to a division within the completely different office of Matins.

Originally, monks would rise in the middle of the night to sing praises to God. Saint Symeon the New Theologian mentions Psalm 118, a significant component of the Midnight Office on weekdays, being said privately in the cells before Matins. Today, in most places where the Daily Cycle is observed, the Midnight Office is combined with Matins and the First Hour into one of the three daily aggregates called for in the Typikon.

Concerning the Midnight Office, Saint Mark of Ephesus says: "The beginning of all the hymns and prayers to God is the time (kairos) of the midnight prayer. For, rising from sleep for it, we signify the transportation from the life of the deceit of darkness to the life which is, according to Christ, free and bright, with which we begin to worship God. For it is written, The people who sat in darkness saw a great light" (Isaiah 9:2 and Matthew 4:16). The general tone of the office is one of penitence, tempered by an attitude of hopeful expectation.

In the Russian tradition the Midnight Office often begins with the reading of the Morning Prayers in common, which otherwise would be said privately by the brethren in their cells. At the conclusion of the Midnight Office, just as at the end of Compline, it is traditional in many places for everyone present to venerate the icons and relics of the saints that are present in the temple (church building).

In Greek Prayer Books, a modified form of the Midnight Office is used for Morning Prayers for laymen, while a modified form of Small Compline is used for evening prayers.

In Syriac Christianity, the office is prayed at 12 am, being known as Lilio in the West Syriac tradition and Leliya in the East Syriac tradition; it is prayed by all members in these denominations, both clergy and laity, being one of the seven fixed prayer times.

== History ==
From the time of the early Church, the practice of seven fixed prayer times have been taught; in Apostolic Tradition, Hippolytus instructed Christians to pray seven times a day "on rising, at the lighting of the evening lamp, at bedtime, at midnight" and "the third, sixth and ninth hours of the day, being hours associated with Christ's Passion." With respect to midnight prayer and the ablutions preceding it, Hippolytus wrote:

Around midnight rise and wash your hands with water and pray. If you are married, pray together. But if your spouse is not yet baptized, go into another room to pray, and then return to bed. Do not hesitate to pray, for one who has been joined in marital relations is not impure. Those who have bathed have no need to wash again, for they are pure. By catching your breath in your hand and signing yourself with the moisture of your breath, your body is purified, even to the feet. For the gift of the Spirit and the outpouring of the baptism, proceeding from the heart of the believer as though from a fountain, purifies the one who has believed. Thus it is necessary to pray at this hour. For those elders who handed down the tradition to us taught us that in this hour every creature hushes for a brief moment to praise the Lord. Stars and trees and waters stand still for an instant. All the host of angels serving him, together with the souls of the righteous, praise God. This is why it is important that all those who believe make certain to pray at that hour. Testifying to this, the Lord says thus, "Behold, a cry was made at midnight, saying, 'Behold the bridegroom is coming! Arise to meet him!'" And he adds, saying, "Watch, therefore, for you do not know when the hour is coming."

== Eastern Orthodox Christianity ==
=== Structure of the Service ===
The Midnight Office can be divided into four parts:

1. Opening—The usual beginning prayers that open most Orthodox offices: a blessing by the priest and prayers by the reader, including the Trisagion and the Lord's Prayer, ending with the call to worship, "O come, let us worship God our King...."
2. First Part—Psalm 50 and a Kathisma from the Psalter (differing according to the day of the week—see below), Nicene Creed, Trisagion and Lord's Prayer followed by the Troparia and prayers, concluding with a blessing by the Priest. During Lenten services there follows the Prayer of Saint Ephrem.
3. Second Part—"O come, let us worship..." and Psalms 120 and 133, followed by the Trisagion, Troparia of Repentance, an intercession and a blessing by the priest.
4. Conclusion—Next follows a mutual asking of forgiveness between the priest and all the brethren. Then the priest says a litany during which everyone slowly and quietly chants "Lord, have mercy," concluding with a final blessing by the Priest.

At the present time, the Midnight Office will take one of four forms, depending upon the particular day: (a) Weekdays, (b) Saturday, (c) Sunday, and (d) a unique form which is observed only on Holy Saturday as part of the Paschal Vigil.

=== Weekdays ===
The distinguishing feature of the Midnight Office on weekdays is the reading of the Seventeenth Kathisma comprising Psalm 118, the longest Psalm in the Bible, in the First Part of the office. The troparia chanted in the First Part are the Troparia of the Bridegroom: "Behold, the Bridegroom cometh at midnight...", recalling the Parable of the Wise and Foolish Virgins. The first of these troparia is also solemnly chanted at Matins during Holy Week, from which the Matins service on these days derives its name of "Bridegroom Prayer."

=== Saturday ===
On Saturday, Psalm 118 is always read at Matins as kathisma, so here it is replaced by the Ninth Kathisma, comprising Psalms 64-69. The troparia in the First Part are different from those used on weekdays. Before the Second Part, a special Prayer of Saint Eustratius is read.

=== Sunday ===
On Sunday, Psalm 118 is often (though not always) read at Matins, so it is not read at the Midnight Office. The psalm is normally replaced by a Canon to the Holy Trinity, composed by St. Theophanes, according to the tone of the week in the Octoechos. Since the Sunday services, which celebrate the Resurrection of Christ, are normally longer than the weekday services, the Midnight Office is shortened. The Nicene Creed, Troparia and prayers from the First Part, as well as the entire Second Part of the service are omitted. Instead, after the canon, special hymns to the Trinity by Saint Gregory of Sinai are chanted, followed by the Trisagion, the Lord’s Prayer and resurrectional hymn called the Ypakoë in the tone of the week. The Prayer to the Most Holy Trinity by Mark the Monk is read and then the mutual asking of forgiveness, Litany and dismissal.

In the Russian tradition, an All-Night Vigil is celebrated every Sunday (commencing in the evening on Saturday), and so the Midnight Office and Compline are usually omitted. In some places the Midnight Office is read on Sunday morning before the Little Hours and Divine Liturgy. The Greeks do not normally celebrate an All-Night Vigil on Sunday, so they read the Midnight Office in its usual place before Matins on Sunday morning.

=== Holy Saturday ===
On Great and Holy Saturday, the Midnight Office takes a very particular form in which it is celebrated on only this one night of the year. Holy Saturday is often the only time that the Midnight Office will be read in parishes. It is the last office found in the liturgical book that contains the services of Great Lent, the Lenten Triodion. The Office is read around the epitaphios, a shroud embroidered with the image of Christ prepared for burial in the Tomb, which has been placed on a catafalque in the center of the church. After the Opening and Psalm 50, the Canon of Great Saturday is chanted (repeated from the Matins service the night before) as a reflection upon the meaning of Christ’s death and His Harrowing of Hell. During the last Ode of the Canon, the priest and deacon carry the epitaphios into the sanctuary and lay it upon the Altar, where it will remain throughout the Paschal season as a reminder of the burial cloth left in the Empty Tomb (John 20:5). Then a brief litany is read and the priest says the dismissal. All lights in the church are extinguished, and everyone waits in silence and darkness for the stroke of midnight, when the Resurrection of Christ is to be proclaimed. Then the Pentecostarion will begin.

Due to the all-importance of the Passion and Resurrection of Christ, the Midnight Office is not read in church from Thursday in Holy Week until after Thomas Sunday (The Sunday after Easter), except for the Paschal Vigil. If the Office is chanted during this time, it is done so privately. If one reads the Midnight Office privately during Bright Week the format used is that of the Paschal Hours.

== Oriental Orthodox Christianity ==
=== West Syriac Church ===
In the Syriac Orthodox Church and Malankara Orthodox Syrian Church (both of which are Oriental Orthodox Churches), as well as the Mar Thoma Syrian Church (an Oriental Protestant denomination), the Midnight Office is known as Lilio and is prayed at 12 am using the Shehimo breviary.

=== Coptic Church ===
In the Coptic Orthodox Church, an Oriental Orthodox denomination, the Midnight Praise is prayed at 12 am using the Agpeya breviary.
