= Paschal troparion =

Troparion in the Byzantine Rite

The Paschal troparion or Christos anesti (Koinē Greek: Χριστὸς ἀνέστη) is the characteristic troparion for the celebration of Pascha (Easter) in the Byzantine Rite.

Like most troparia, it is a brief stanza often used as a refrain between the verses of a psalm, but is also used on its own. It is sung in the first plagal (or fifth) tone. Its author or date is unknown.

== Text ==
Greek

Χριστὸς ἀνέστη ἐκ νεκρῶν,
θανάτῳ θάνατον πατήσας,
καὶ τοῖς ἐν τοῖς μνήμασι,
ζωὴν χαρισάμενος!

Transliteration

Christós anésti ek nekrón,
thanáto thánaton patísas,
ké tís en tís mnímasi,
zoín charisámenos!

English translation

Christ is risen from the dead,
by death trampling death,
and to those in the tombs
granting life!

Poetic English translation
by Vladimir Morosan

Christ is risen from the dead,
trampling down death by death,
and upon those in the tombs
bestowing life!

The first line paraphrases from 1 Corinthians 15:20 (Νυνὶ δὲ Χριστὸς ἐγήγερται ἐκ νεκρῶν). The troparion is part of the Paschal Divine Liturgy of the Byzantine Rite, and it was certainly in use in the 5th or 6th century. Its ultimate origin is unknown; Metropolitan Hilarion Alfeyev (2009) has suggested a 2nd-century origin.

== Usage ==
According to the testimony of the Jerusalem tropologion (or iadgari, an ancient hymnography surviving only in a Georgian translation of the 8th century), the troparion was sung at the end of the Easter Vigil in the late ancient Jerusalem Easter liturgy. Based on the Typikon of the Great Church, the troparion was part of the non-monastic liturgy at the Hagia Sophia by the 10th century.

In Finland, the Orthodox Church of Finland is a minority church. However, the Orthodox Easter Vigil has been broadcast on radio and television for decades, and so the troparion gradually became well-known to non-Orthodox Finns. In 1986, the Evangelical Lutheran Church of Finland – the largest religious denomination in the country — added the troparion to its revised official hymnal, where it is hymn number 90, used for Easter. It is recommended to be sung three times in succession.

At Pope Francis' funeral, after the Litany of the Saints, the patriarchs, archbishops, and metropolitans of the Eastern Catholic Churches stood beside the coffin of Pope Francis for the Supplicatio Ecclesiae Orientalium (formerly known as the Officio Defectorum in Byzantine liturgy). While thrice chanting the Paschal troparion and chanting prayers, one of the patriarchs censed the coffin. This ritual was also performed at the funeral of Pope John Paul II.

== In other languages ==
Language	Translation	Transliteration	Reference
Albanian	Krishti u-ngjall se vdékuresh, me vdékjé vdékjén shkéli édhé te varrosurvé u fali jéten!		
Arabic	المسيح قام من بين الأموات و وطئ الموت بالموت و وهب الحياة للذين في القبور	Al-Masīh qām min baīni'l-amwāt Wa wati’ al-mawt bi'l-mawt Wa wahab al-hayāt Lil-ladhīna fī'l-qubūr!	
Basque	Piztu da Kristo hiletarik, Hilez garbaitu du herioa, piztuz ateratzen gaitzu gure hobietarik!		
Belarusian (Cyrillic orthography)	Хрыстос уваскрос зь мёртвых, Сьмерцю сьмерць зваяваў І тым, што ў магілах Жыцьцё дараваў!	Khrystos uvaskros z' myortvykh, S'myertsyu s'myerts' zvayavaw I tym, shto w mahilakh Zhyts'tsyo daravaw	
Belarusian (Latin orthography)	Chrystos uvaskros ź miortvych, Śmierciu śmierć zvajavaŭ I tym, što ŭ mahiłach Zyćcio daravaŭ		
Bulgarian	Христос възкръсна от мъртвите, като със смърт смъртта потъпка и на тия, които са в гробовете, дарува живот.	Hristos vǎzkrǎsna ot mǎrtvite, kato sǎs smǎrt smǎrtta potǎpka i na tija, koito sa v grobovete, daruva život.	
Chinese	基督已經從死裡復活， 他的死勝過死亡， 把生命賜給已埋葬 在墓中的人。	Jīdū yǐjīng cóng sǐ lǐ fùhuó, tā de sǐ shèngguò sǐwáng, bǎ shēngmìng cì gěi yǐ máizàng zài mù zhōng de rén.	
Church Slavonic	Христосъ воскресе изъ мертвыхъ, Смертiю смерть поправъ И сущимъ во гробѣхъ Животъ даровавъ.	Khristos voskrese iz mertvykh, Smertiyu smert poprav, I sushchim vo grobekh Zhivot darovav!	
Church Slavonic; Earlier version (currently only used by the Old Believers)	Хрїстосъ воскресе изъ мертвыхъ, Смертїю на смерть настѹпи, И грѡбным животъ дарова!	Khristos voskrese iz mertvykh Smertiyu na smert nastupi I grobnym zhivot darova!	
Coptic	Ⲡⲓⲭ̀ⲣⲓⲥⲧⲟⲥ ⲁϥⲧⲱⲛϥ ⲉ̀ⲃⲟⲗ ϧⲉⲛ ⲛⲏⲉⲑⲙⲱⲟⲩⲧ: ⲫⲏⲉ̀ⲧⲁϥⲙⲟⲩ ⲁϥϩⲱⲙⲓ ⲉ̀ϫⲉⲛ ⲫ̀ⲙⲟⲩ ⲟⲩⲟϩ ⲛⲏⲉⲧⲭⲏ ϧⲉⲛ ⲛⲓⲙ̀ϩⲁⲩ ⲁϥⲉⲣϩ̀ⲙⲟⲧ ⲛⲱⲟⲩ ⲙ̀ⲡⲓⲱⲛϧ ⲛ̀ⲉ̀ⲛⲉϩ.	Pekhrestos aftonf evol-khennee-ethmoot, fee-etaf-mo af-homy, ejen efmo owoh, nee etky khen-nee-emhaf, afer-ehmot no-oo empy-onkh en-eneh	
Czech	Vstal z mrtvých Kristus, smrtí smrt překonal a jsoucím ve hrobech, život daroval!		
Dutch	Christus is opgestaan uit de doden, door Zijn dood vertreedt Hij de dood en schenkt het Leven aan hen in het graf!		
Eastern Armenian		K’ristos haryav i mereloc’. Mahvamb zmah koxeac’ yev merelyac’ kyank pargevec’av.	
Filipino	Si Kristo ay nabuhay mula sa mga patay, Sa pamamagitan ng kanyang kamatayan, nilupig niya ang kamatayan, At ang mga nasa himlayan Ay binigyan niya ng buhay!		
Finnish	Kristus nousi kuolleista, kuolemallaan kuoleman voitti ja haudoissa oleville elämän antoi.		
French	Le Christ est ressuscité des morts; par la mort, il a vaincu la mort; à ceux qui sont dans les tombeaux il a donné la vie!		
Georgian	ქრისტე აღსდგა მკვდრეთით, სიკვდილითა სიკვდილისა დამთრგუნველი და საფლავების შინათა ცხოვრების მიმნიჭებელი!	Kriste aghsdga mkvdretit, sikvdilita sikvdilisa damtrgunveli, da saplavebis shinata tskhovrebis mimnichebeli.	
German	Christus ist auferstanden von den Toten hat den Tod durch den Tod zertreten und denen in den Gräbern das Leben geschenkt!		
Hawaiian	Ua ala a'e nei 'o Kristo mai ka moe lepo, e hehi ʻana i ka make ma o kona make a; i nā mea i loko o nā ilina e manawale'a ana aku i ke ola!		
Hungarian	Feltámadt Krisztus halottaiból, legyőzte halállal a halált, és a sírban lévőknek életet ajándékozott!		
Indonesian	Kristus t'lah bangkit dari mati Dengan matinya t'lah menginjak-injak maut Dan pada mereka yang di kuburan hidup dianugerahkan!		
Italian	Cristo è risorto dai morti, Con la morte ha vinto la morte, E a quelli nelle tombe Ha donato la vita!		
Japanese	ハリストス死より復活し、 死を以て死を滅ぼし、 墓に在る者に 生命を賜へり。	Harisutosu shi yori fukkatsu shi, shi o motte shi o horoboshi, haka ni aru mono ni inochi o tamaeri.	
Kapampangan	Y Cristo sinubli yang mebie qng Camatayan. Qng panga'mate na menagumpe ya qng Camatayan, at bi'nie na ing bie careng Maca'cutcut.		
Korean	그리스도께서 부활하셨네 죽음으로 죽음을 멸하시고 무덤에 있는 자들에게 생명을 베푸셨나이다!	Geuriseudokkeseo buhwalhasyeonne jugeumeuro jugeumeul myeolhasigo mudeome inneun jadeurege saengmyeong'eul bepusyeonnaida!	
Latin	Christus resurrexit a mortuis, Morte mortem calcavit, Et entibus in sepulchris Vitam donavit.		
Latvian	Kristus no miroņiem augšāmcēlies, Nāvi ar nāvi iznīcinājis Un tiem, kas kapos, Dzīvību dāvinājis!		
Lithuanian	Kristus prisikėlė iš numirusių, Savo mirtimi mirtį nugalėjo, Mirusiems gyvybę dovanojo		
Palauan	Kristus a mla mekiis ra kodall, Sirreihi a kodall loba kodall, el kirel ar ngara debull el nguu a klengar.		
Pingelapese	Krais isada sang mehla, kaluwehdiehr mehla pwehki ah pwoula, oh ketkiheng irail nan sousou mour.		
Polish	Chrystus powstał z martwych, śmiercią podeptał śmierć i będącym w grobach życie dał!		
Portuguese	Cristo ressuscitou dos mortos, pisando a morte com a morte, e dando a vida aos sepultados.		
Romanian	Hristos a înviat din morţi, Cu moartea pre moarte călcând, Şi celor din morminte, Viaţă dăruindu-le!		
Serbian	Христос васкрсе из мртвих, смрћу смрт уништи, и онима који су у гробовима, живот дарова!	Hristos vaskrse iz mrtvih, Smrcu smrt unisti, I onoma koji su u grobovima, zivot darova!	
Slovak	Kristus slávne vstal z mŕtvych, smrťou smrť premohol a tým, čo sú v hroboch život daroval!		
Slovenian	Kristus je vstal od mrtvih, z vstajenjem je premagal smrt in tistim, ki so v grobovih, je daroval življenje!		
Slovenian	Kristus je vstal od mrtvih, z vstajenjem je premagal smrt, in dal življenje mrtvim v grobeh!		
Spanish	[metaphrase] Cristo ha resucitado de los muertos, con la Muerte a la muerte habiendo pisoteado y a los en los monumentos la Vida habiendo donado.		
Spanish	[Adapted to the Hellenic melodies] Cristo ha resucitado de los muertos, la muerte con la Muerte pisoteando y a los en los monumentos la Vida donando.		
Turkish	Mesih ölülerden dirildi, ölüm ile ölümü tepeleyerek ve mezarda olanlara hayat bağışladı.		
Ukrainian	Христос воскрес із мертвих, смертю смерть подолав, і тим, що в гробах, життя дарував!	Xrystos voskres iz mertvyx, smertju smertʹ podolav, i tym, ščo v hrobax, žyttja daruvav!	
