= 1813 in Russia =

Events from the year 1813 in Russia

== Incumbents ==
- Monarch – Alexander I

== Events ==
- Russo-Persian War (1804–1813)
  - January 7–13 - Siege of Lankaran
  - October 24 - Treaty of Gulistan ends the war
- War of the Sixth Coalition (December 1812 - May 1814)
  - January 16 - Siege of Danzig begins; the city surrendered January 2, 1814
  - February 28 - Treaty of Kalisz, Prussia officially joins the coalition against France
  - April 5 - Battle of Möckern
  - May 2 - Battle of Lützen
  - May 20–21 - Battle of Bautzen
  - May 22 - Battle of Reichenbach
  - June 4 - Battle of Luckau
  - June 4 - Truce of Pläswitz paused fighting until July 10, later extended to August 10
  - June 14, 15, 27 - Treaties of Reichenbach formalize coalition against France
  - July 6 - Treaty of Peterswaldau between Russia and England
  - August 26 - Battle of the Katzbach
  - August 26–27 - Battle of Dresden
  - August 27 - Battle of Hagelberg
  - August 29–30 – Battle of Kulm
  - September 6 - Battle of Dennewitz
  - September 9 - Treaty of Töplitz between Austria, Prussia, and Russia
  - September 16 - Battle of the Göhrde
  - September 17 - Second Battle of Kulm
  - September 28 - Battle of Altenburg
  - October 10 - Siege of Dresden begins. The French garrison surrendered on November 11
  - October 14 - Battle of Liebertwolkwitz
  - October 16–19 - Battle of Leipzig
  - November 17 - Siege of Naarden begins; the French garrison leaves May 12, 1814
  - December 10 - Battle of Sehested
  - December 13 - Siege of Hamburg begins; the French garrison left the city on May 12, 1814
  - December 19–22 - Siege of Breda French forces fail to retake the city
- Golovnin Incident ends with the release of Vasily Golovnin by the Japanese on October 6
- Svetlana (ballad) by Vasily Zhukovsky published
- Russky Invalid, a long-running military newspaper, founded in Saint Petersburg

== Births ==
- Pavel Annenkov (d. 1887), literary critic and memoirist
- Viktor Askochensky (d. 1879), writer, journalist, and historian
- Ivan Bartolomei (d. 1870), general, numismatist, ethnographer
- Nicholas Benois (d. 1898), architect of French and German ancestry
- Antonina Bludova (d. 1891), philanthropist, salonist, memoirist, and lady-in-waiting
- Nachman Chazan (d. 1884), scholar and figure in Breslov Hasidism
- David Dadiani (d. 1853), Prince of Mingrelia (1846–1853) and Russian general
- Alexander Dargomyzhsky (d. 1869), Russian composer
- Anatoly Demidov, 1st Prince of San Donato (d. 1870), expatriate aristocrat, industrialist, diplomat, state councillor, arts patron
- Giorgi Eristavi (d. 1864), Georgian playwright, poet, and journalist
- Timofey Granovsky (d. 1855), founder of Russian medieval studies
- Kreeta Haapasalo (d. 1893), Finnish folk singer and kantele player
- Semen Hulak-Artemovsky (d. 1879), opera composer, baritone, actor, and dramatist
- Carl Jaenisch (d. 1872), Finnish-born chess player and theorist
- Paulina Krakowowa (d. 1882), Polish writer, educator, editor, and social activist
- Lev Kulchitsky (d. 1873), admiral, mayor of Taganrog
- Charles H. Liebermann (d. 1886), Jewish Russian-American physician, co-founder of the Georgetown University School of Medicine
- Artur Nepokoychitsky (d. 1881), general of Polish ancestry
- Gennady Nevelskoy (d. 1876), naval officer, explorer of the Russian Far East
- Nikolay Ogarev (d. 1877), poet, historian, political activist
- Alexander Ozersky (d. 1880), geologist, governor of Tomsk
- Vasily Samoylov (d. 1887), actor, opera singer, painter
- Vladimir Sollogub (d. 1882), writer, salonist, government official
- Ernst von Stackelberg (d. 1870), Baltic German soldier and diplomat
- Nikolai Stankevich (d. 1840), poet and philosopher
- Kapiton Ushkov (d. 1868), industrialist
- Karol Wedel (d. 1902), German who built a confectionary business in Warsaw

== Deaths ==
- Ivan Adamovich (b. 1752), general, fought at Battle of Borodino
- Stepan Degtyarev (b. 1766), composer
- Elizabeth Divov (b. 1762), courtier
- Magnus Gustav von Essen (b. 1759), Baltic German general, governor of Riga
- Aleksandr Figner (b. 1787), officer, organizer of partisans
- Boris Vladimirovich Golitsyn (b. 1769), aristocrat, general
- Ilija Novokršteni (b. ?), cavalry officer, advisor to Serbian rebels
- Ilya Gruzinov (b. 1781), professor of anatomy and physiology
- Pyotr Khanykov (b. 1743), admiral
- Mikhail Kutuzov (b. 1745), Field Marshal and diplomat
- Aleksey Melissino (b. c. 1759), major general
- Dmitry Neverovsky (b. 1771), general
- Andrei Rosenberg (b. 1739), Baltic German general
- Hayyim Tyrer (b. about 1740), Hasidic rabbi and kabbalist
- Alexander Vasilchikov (b. 1746), aristocrat, lover of Catherine the Great
- Artemiy Ivanovich Vorontsov (b. 1748), nobleman, senator, Active Privy Councillor
