= Artemy Vedel =

Ukrainian-born Russian composer (1767–1808)

- Артем Ведель
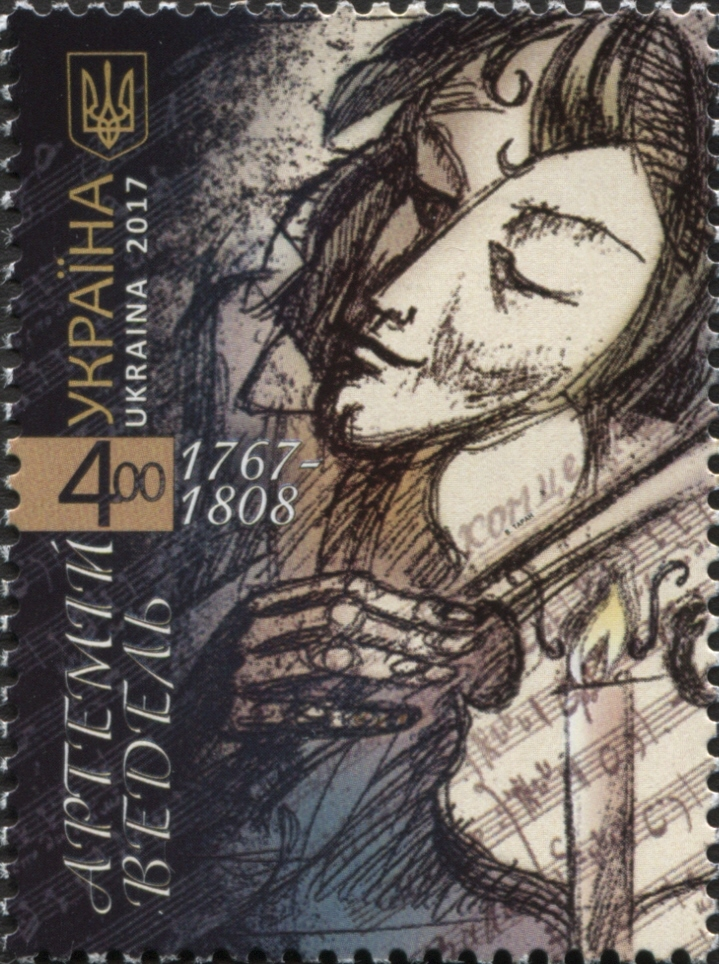
- Vedel depicted on a Ukrainian commemorative stamp
- Born: 13 April [O.S. 2 April] 1767; Kyiv, Little Russia Governorate, Russian Empire
- Died: 26 July [O.S. 14 July] 1808 (aged 41); Kyiv, Kiev Governorate, Russian Empire
- Education: Kyiv-Mohyla Academy
- Works: List of compositions

Artemy Lukyanovich Vedel (Note: Russian: Артемий Лукьянович Ведель, Ukrainian: Артем Лук'янович Ведель, romanized: Artem Lukianovych Vedel, also Ukrainian: Артемій, romanized: Artemiy / Artemii) (13 April [O.S. 2 April] 1767 – 26 July [O.S. 14 July] 1808), born Artemy Lukyanovich Vedelsky, was a Ukrainian-born Russian composer of military and liturgical music. He produced works based on Ukrainian folk melodies, and made an important contribution in the music history of Ukraine. Together with Maxim Berezovsky and Dmitry Bortniansky, Vedel is recognised by musicologists as one of the "Golden Three" composers of 18th century Ukrainian classical music, and one of Russia's greatest choral composers.

Vedel was born in Kyiv, the son of a wealthy wood carver. He studied at the Kyiv-Mohyla Academy until 1787, after which he was appointed to conduct the academy's choir and orchestra. In 1788, he was sent to Moscow to work for the regional governor, but he returned home in 1791 and resumed his career at the Kyiv-Mohyla Academy. General Andrei Levanidov recruited him to lead Kyiv's regimental chapel and choir—under Levanidov's patronage, Vedel reached the peak of his creativity as a composer. He moved with Levanidov to the Kharkov Governorate, where he organised a new choir and orchestra, and taught at the Kharkiv Collegium.

His fortunes declined when the cultural life of Kharkiv was affected by decrees issued by Tsar Paul I of Russia. Lacking a patron, and with his music unable to be performed, he returned home to Kyiv in 1798, and became a novice monk of the Kyiv Pechersk Lavra. The monastery's authorities discovered handwritten threats towards the Russian royal family, and accused Vedel of writing them. He was subsequently incarcerated as a mental patient, and forbidden to compose. After almost a decade, the authorities allowed him to return to his father's house to die.

Vedel's music was censored during the period that Ukraine was part of the Soviet Union. More than 80 of his works are known, including 31 choral concertos, but many of his compositions are lost. Most of his choral music uses texts taken from the Psalms. The style of Vedel's compositions reflects the changes taking place in classical music during his lifetime; he was influenced by Ukrainian Baroque traditions, but also by new Western European operatic and instrumental styles.

== Background ==
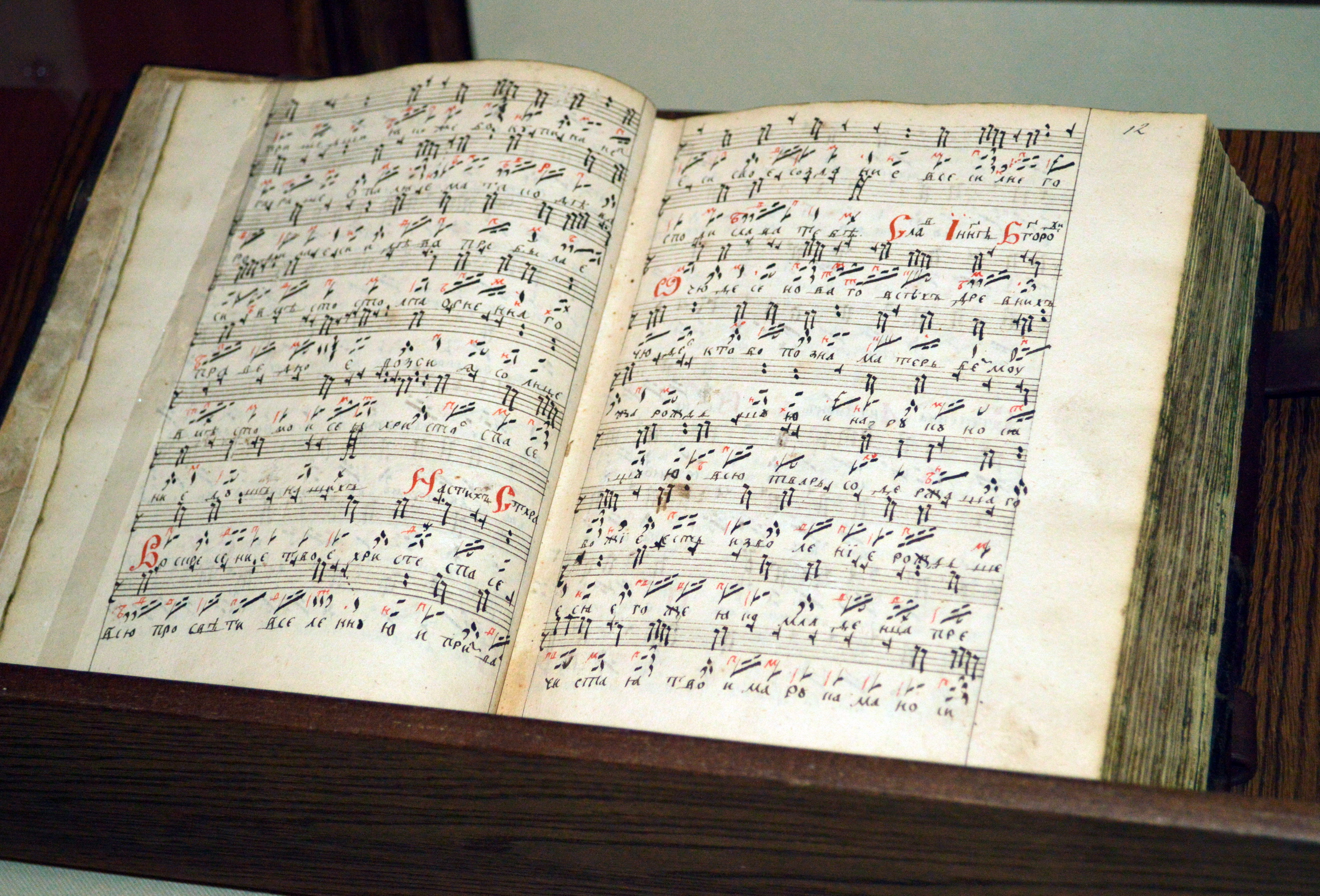
A 17th century dvoyeznamennik or "double banner" score of a znamenny chant—with the znameny written below the modern style (State Historical Museum, Moscow) (Note: Monodies were written in a particular way using symbols called znameny ("banner" symbols) to represent how the music was sung.)

The character of Russian and Ukrainian worship derives from performances of the znamenny chant, which developed a tradition that was characterised by seamless melodies and a capacity to sustain pitch. The tradition reached its culmination during the 16th and 17th centuries, having taken on its own character in the Russian Empire some three centuries earlier.

Choral music has a special significance for Ukrainian culture; according to the musicologist Yurii Chekan, "choral music embodies Ukrainian national mentality, and the soul of the people". Ukrainian choral music changed during the Baroque era; passion and emotion, contrasting dynamics, timbre and musical texture were introduced, and monody was replaced by polyphony. The new polychoral culture became known as the partesnyi ("singing in parts") style. During the 19th century, Znamenny chants were gradually superseded by newer ones, such as the Kyiv chant, which in their turn, were replaced by music that was closer to recitative. Most Znamenny melodies gradually become lost or forgotten. In the early 19th century, music in West-European was making the transition from classical to predominantly Romantic, having earlier shifted away from the Baroque style.

The tradition of Russian church music can be traced back to Dmitry Bortniansky, who revered the Russian liturgical musical tradition. The early part of the 19th century was a period that marked a low ebb in the fortunes of traditional Russian music. Bortniansky studied in Venice before eventually becoming the director of music at the court chapel in St Petersburg in 1801. Composing in an era when attempts were being made to suppress the Russian Empire's cultural heritage, Bortniansky's choral concertos, set to texts in Russian, were modelled on counterpoint, the concerto grosso and Italian instrumental music. Under him, the Imperial Court Chapel expanded its role so it influenced, and eventually controlled, church choral singing throughout the Russian Empire. Vedel followed Bortniansky in combining the Italian Baroque style to ancient Russian hymnody, at a time when classical influences were being introduced into Ukrainian choral music, such as four-voice polyphony, the soloist and the choir singing at different alternative times, and the employment of three or four sections in a work.

== Sources ==
The original biographical sources for Vedel are a biography about his pupil, the composer Pyotr Turchaninov, and an article about Vedel by the historian Viktor Askochensky. Askochensky based his information on verbal accounts by Vedel's contemporaries and a biography written by Vedel's pupil Vasyl Zubovsky. The composer Vasyl Petrushevsky's biography of Vedel, published in 1901, used similar sources.

Documents relating to Vedel were accidentally discovered in 1967 by the Ukrainian nationalist Vasyl Kuk when he was researching the Moscow military archives about NKVD operations against the Ukrainian Insurgent Army. Today, advocates of Vedel such as Mykola Hobdych, the director of the Kyiv Chamber Choir, and the musicologist Tetyana Husarchuk, continue to research and popularise his music. The task of studying Vedel is made more difficult for historians and musicologists because of the fragmentary and superficial nature of the sources—information about his methods is lacking, and his works cannot always be accurately dated.

== Life ==
=== Family ===
Artemy Lukyanovich Vedel was born in Kyiv in the Russian Empire, probably on 13 April 1767. (Note: The date of Vedel's birth is not known for certain. Using the Eastern Orthodox liturgical calendar, a child's baptism name was given in honour of the saint whose day falls closest to the date of birth of the child. The martyrs Artemon and Artemison were commemorated on 13 and 29 April (Old Style).) He was the only son of Lukyan Vlasovych Vedelsky and his wife Elena or Olena Hryhorivna Vedelsky. The family lived in Podil, the old trading and crafts centre of Kyiv, in the parish of the St Boris and St Gleb's Church. Their house stood on what is now the corner between Bratska Street and Andriivska Street; Artemy lived there throughout his childhood. Almost half of the population of Kyiv lived in Podil, which was one of the three walled settlements that formed the city, along with Old Kyiv and Pechersk. (Note: Most of Podil was destroyed by a fire in 1811, after which the area was redeveloped and a new street layout was built.)

The Vedelsky family adhered strictly to the Orthodox faith. Lukyan Vlasovich Vedelsky was a wealthy carver of wooden iconostases, who owned his own workshop. The name Vedel, probably an abbreviated form of Vedelsky, was how the composer signed his letters, and named himself in military documents. His father signed himself "Kyiv citizen Lukyan Vedelsky". (Note: The name Vedel is not itself of Slavic origin, but is common in western Europe, especially in northern Germany, Denmark and Norway.)

=== Early years in Kyiv ===
Vedel was a boy chorister in the Eparchial (bishop's) choir in Kyiv. He studied at the Kyiv-Mohyla Academy, where his teachers included the Italian Giuseppe Sarti, who spent 18 years as an operatic composer in the Russian Empire. By the end of the 18th century, most of the students attending the Kyiv-Mohyla Academy were preparing for the priesthood. It was at that time the oldest and most influential higher education institution in the Russian Empire; most of the country's leading academics were originally graduates of the academy.

Vedel attended the academy until 1787. After that he studied philosophy and music, and began composing as a student of Potemkin's Musical Academy. Whilst studying the advanced philosophy course, he was appointed as the conductor of the academy's choir—the academy provided extensive programmes for the training of choral singers—and conducted the student orchestra. He also performed as a solo violinist. He studied the academy's theoretical books on music, and became acquainted with the religious works (including cantatas) composed by the academy's students, as well as the spiritual concerts of Andriy Rachynsky, and perhaps also those of Sarti and Maxim Berezovsky.

=== Moscow ===
In 1788 Vedel, along with other choristers, was sent by Samuel Myslavsky, the Metropolitan of Kyiv and Halych, and the rector of Kyiv-Mohyla Academy, to Moscow. There he served as the assistant choir master and a violinist for Pyotr Dmitrievich Yeropkin, the Governor-General of Moscow, and, after 1790, by his successor, Alexander Prozorovsky. The choir was at the time an artistically important part of the Imperial Court in Moscow.

Vedel's talent was recognised by other musicians in Moscow. He probably continued his musical studies at the university. During this period, he had the opportunity to become more familiar with Russian and Western European musical cultures. He did not stay in Moscow for long and, resigning his position, he returned home to Kyiv in the early 1790s.

=== Patronage under Andrei Levanidov ===
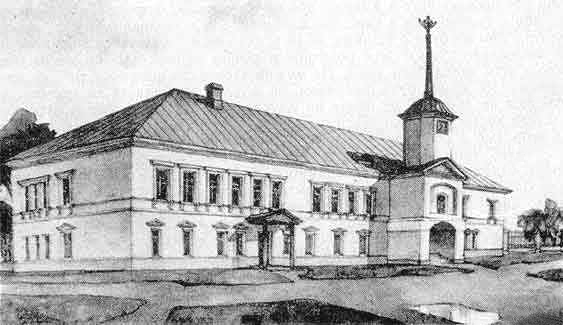
The Kharkiv Collegium as it looked during the first part of the 19th century

In Kyiv, Vedel returned to leading the Kyiv-Mohyla Academy choir. Among the famous choirs in the city at that time was one belonging to General Andrei Levanidov at the Kyiv headquarters of the Ukrainian infantry regiment. From early 1794, Levanidov acquired Vedel's services to lead the regimental chapel and the children's choir. Levanidov, who valued and respected Vedel as a composer and a musician, was able to act as an influential patron—the years from 1794 to 1798 saw the zenith of Vedel's musical creativity. From 1793 to 1794 he directed the choirs of both the Kyiv-Mohyla Academy and his patron. He was rapidly promoted within the army; on 1 March 1794 he was appointed as a staff clerk, and on 27 April 1795 he became a junior adjutant.

On 13 March 1796, Levanidov was appointed as Governor General of the Kharkiv Governorate. The composer moved to Kharkiv, along with his best musicians. In Kharkov (now Kharkiv, Ukraine) Vedel organised a new gubernia (governorate) choir and orchestra, and taught singing and music at the Kharkiv Collegium, which was second only to the Kyiv-Mohyla Academy in terms of its curriculum. The music class at the Kharkiv Collegium was first recorded in 1798, when in January that year two canons and a choral concerto by Vedel were performed.

Vedel did much of his composing during this period. Works included the concerts "Resurrect God" and "Hear the Lord my voice" (dated 6 October 1796) and the two-choir concerto "The Lord passes me". The composer and his works were highly valued in Kharkiv; his concerts were studied and performed at the Kharkiv Collegium, and they were sung in churches. Bortniansky, who conducted the St. Petersburg State Academic Capella, praised the quality of Vedel's teaching. In September 1796, Vedel was promoted to become a senior adjutant, with the rank of captain.

=== Decline in fortunes ===
In December 1796, on the orders of Tsar Paul I, the Kharkiv Governorate was abolished, and was replaced by the newly created Sloboda Ukrainian Governorate. Levanidov was dismissed on 9 January 1797, when his corps was disbanded by Paul I, and he left Kharkiv. Paul I decreed that all regimental chapels were to be abolished, which caused Vedel to resign from the army in October 1797. He worked as a musician for the governor of the new province, Aleksey Teplov. Teplov, who as a young man had received an excellent musical education, treated Vedel as well as he could.

The tsar's decrees caused the cultural and artistic life of Kharkiv to decline. The city's theatre was closed, and its choirs and orchestras were dissolved. Performances of Vedel's works in churches were banned, as the tsar had prohibited singing in churches of any form of music except during the Divine Liturgy.

The loss of Levanidov's support caused Vedel to become deeply depressed. Despite the support he received from Teplov, Vedel decided to leave Kharkiv. He distributed his belongings (including all his manuscripts), and the end of the summer of 1798 he returned to live at his parents' house in Kyiv. There he wrote two choral concertos, "God, the law-breaker of the rebellion against me" (11 November 1798) and "To the Lord we always mourn". The concertos were performed in the Epiphany Cathedral and St Sophia Cathedral in the city.

=== Life as a novice ===
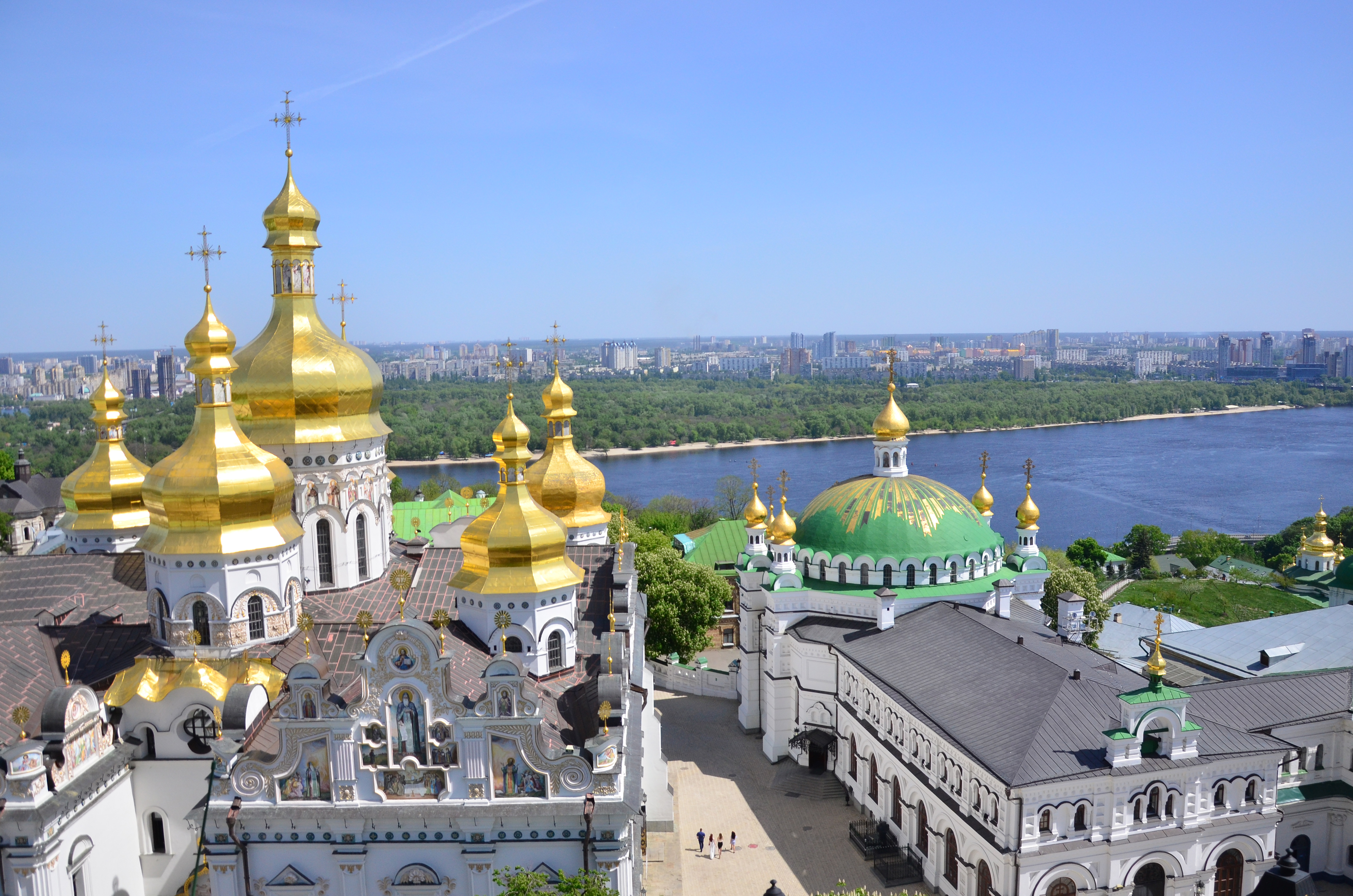
Kyiv Pechersk Lavra, where Vedel was a novice monk

Early in 1799, frustrated by the lack of opportunities to compose and teach and possibly suffering from a form of mental illness, Vedel enrolled as a novice monk at the Kyiv Pechersk Lavra. He was an active member of the community and was respected by the monks for his asceticism.

According to Turcaninov's biography, the Metropolitan of Kyiv commissioned Vedel to write a song of praise in honour of a royal visit to Kyiv, but Vedel instead wrote a letter to the tsar, probably of a political nature. Vedel was arrested in Okhtyrka, pronounced insane, and returned to Kyiv.

Vedel returned to live with his father in an attempt to regain his mental health. Back home in Kyiv, he was able to compose, read, and play the violin, and he may have returned to teach at the Kyiv Academy. By leaving the monastery before his training was completed, Vedel may have angered Hierotheus, the Metropolitan bishop. When the monastery authorities discovered a book containing handwritten insults about the royal family, the Metropolitan accused Vedel of writing in the book. He dismissed Vedel's servants, and personally detained him. On 25 May 1799, Hierotheus declared that Vedel was mentally ill.

=== Imprisonment and death ===
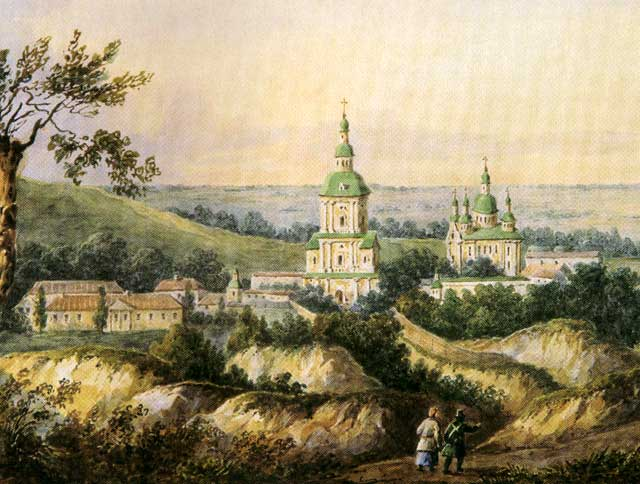
St. Cyril's Monastery, Kyiv, as depicted in an 1843 watercolour painting

According to Kuk, the official documents relating to Vedel's case show that he was never formally arrested or charged, and that he was never questioned by the authorities or given the opportunity to defend himself. Vedel's case was referred in turn from the governor of Kyiv to the governor of Ukraine Alexander Bekleshov, the Attorney General of Russia, and to the tsar. While the case was being dealt with in St. Petersburg, Vedel, then seriously ill, was placed under his father's care in Kyiv. He was found guilty, and was incarcerated at the asylum of St. Cyril's Monastery, Kyiv, for an indefinite period. In the asylum, he was forbidden to write or compose. When the asylum was closed in 1803, the patients were moved to a new hospital in Kyiv.

After the death of Paul I in 1801, the new tsar, Alexander I, proclaimed an amnesty for unjustly imprisoned convicts, and many prisoners were released. Alexander ordered that Vedel's case should be re-examined, but Vedel was again declared insane and remained an inmate. The tsar wrote of Vedel on 15 May 1802: "... leave in the present captivity".

In 1808, after nine years' imprisonment, and by now mortally ill, Vedel was allowed to return home to his father's house in Kyiv. Shortly before his death there on 14 July 1808, he is said to have stood and prayed in the garden.

There was uncertainty about exactly when Vedel died, until his death certificate was found in 1910. The cause of his death was never revealed by the authorities. His friend Ioann Levanda (the archpriest of Kyiv Cathedral and a well-known preacher) obtained permission for a decent funeral, an indication that Vedel was considered by the government "to be untrustworthy for the rest of his life". Many mourners attended Vedel's funeral, including students from the Academy. He was buried in the Shchekavytsia cemetery. When the area was redeveloped in the 1930s, the cemetery was destroyed. The location of Vedel's grave is now lost.

== Appearance and character ==
No portrait of Vedel has survived, but he was described by friends as being gentle, calm, friendly, and with "beautiful radiant eyes, burning with a special fire of great spiritual nobility and inspiration". His letters to Turchaninov reveal a care for oppressed people—reflected in his choice of themes for his concertos—as well as an opposition towards serfdom, which had been established in Ukraine by Catherine the Great.

== Music ==
=== Compositions ===
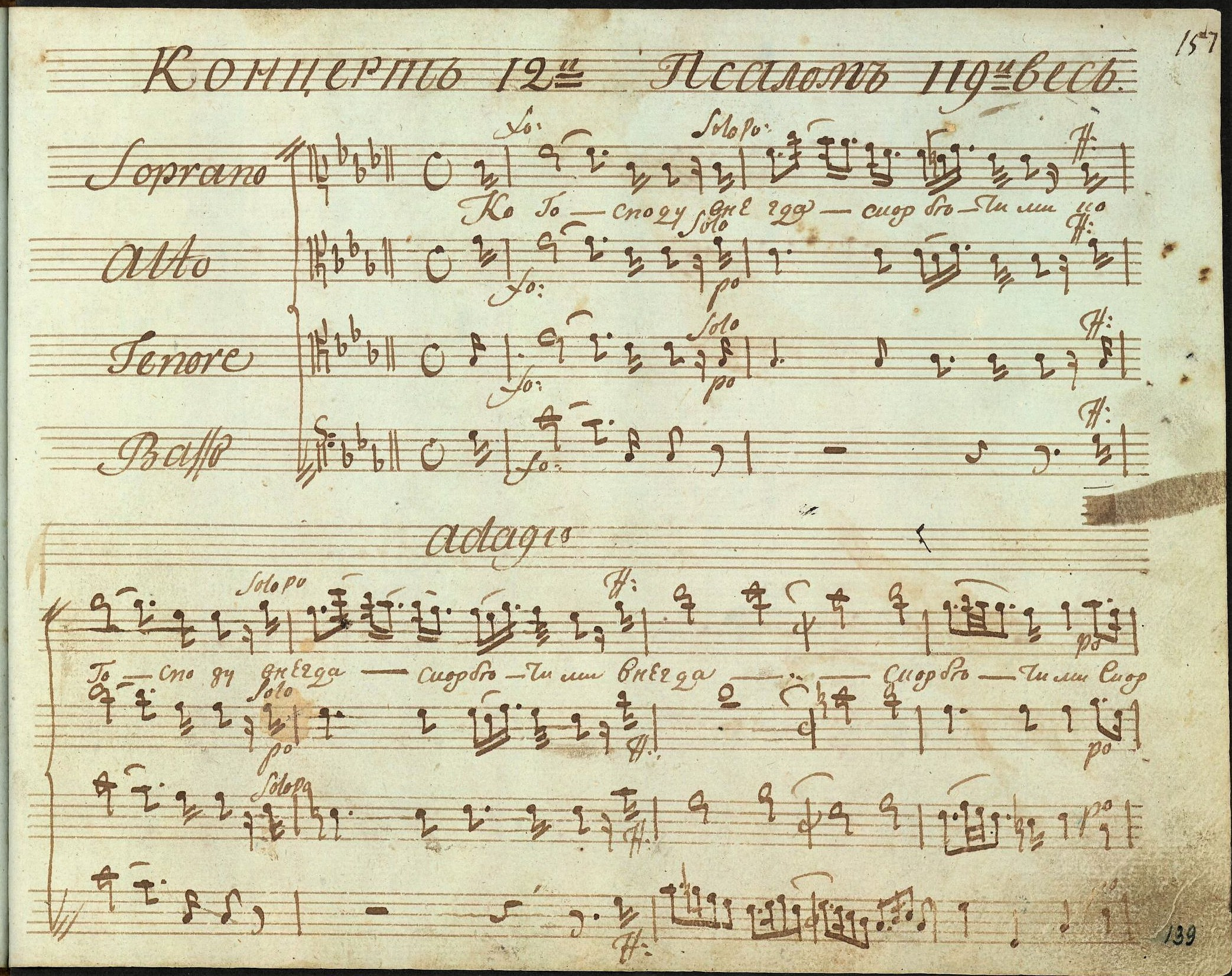
The first page of Vedel's manuscript of the choral concerto No. 12 ("In my trouble I cried to the Lord")

Vedel was almost entirely a liturgical composer of the a cappella choral music sung in Orthodox churches. (Note: In Orthodox Christianity, musical instruments are not used, and singing is an essential ingredient in church services.) At least 80 of his compositions have been identified, including 31 choral concertos and six trios, two liturgies, an all-night vigil, and three irmos cycles. An edition of Vedel's works was published by Mykola Hodbych and Tetiana Husarchuk in 2007.

Many of Vedel's works have been lost. The V.I. Vernadsky National Library of Ukraine holds the only existing autograph score by the composer, the Score of Divine Liturgy of Saint John Chrysostom and Other Compositions. The score consists of 12 choral concertos (composed between 1794 and 1798), and the Liturgy of Saint John Chrysostom. The ink varies in colour, which suggests that Vedel worked on the compositions at different times. It was acquired by Askochensky, who bequeathed it to the Kyiv Academy.

=== Musical style ===
The musicologists Ihor Sonevytsky and Marko Robert Stech consider Vedel to be the archetypal composer of Ukrainian music from the Baroque era. An outstanding tenor singer, he was one of the best choral conductors of his time. He helped to raise the standard of choral singing in Ukraine to previously unknown levels.

Vedel was considered during his lifetime to be a traditional and conservative composer, in contrast to his older contemporaries Berezovsky and Bortniansky. Unlike Vedel, they composed secular, non-spiritual works. He was a famous violinist, but no music by Vedel for the violin is documented. His works, perhaps even more than those of Berezovsky or Bortnyansky, represented a development in Ukrainian musical culture. According to Koshetz, Vedel's music was based on Ukrainian folk melodies.

Vedel's music was written at a time when Western music had largely emerged from the Renaissance and Baroque eras. The style of his compositions reflected two contrasting traditions. He was strongly influenced by the baroque traditions of the Ukrainian hetman culture, with its religious-mystical music linked with ideas about spiritual enlightenment, but was also influenced by developments in new operatic and instrumental styles emerging from Western Europe at that time.

== Legacy ==
=== Censorship and revival ===
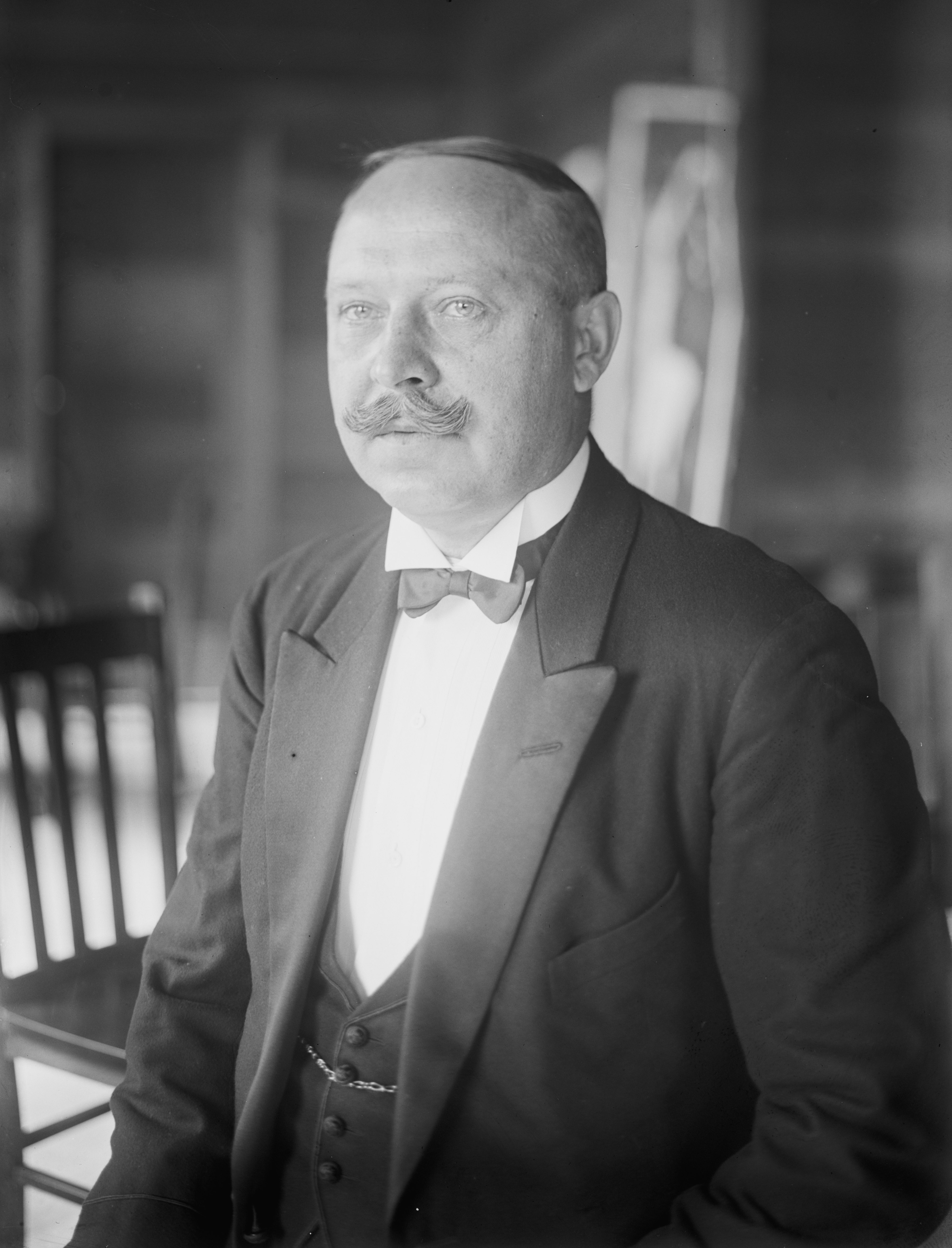
Oleksandr Koshyts (1900), who revived Vedel's music

Performances of Vedel's music were censored and the publication of his scores was prohibited during most of the 19th century. They were secretly distributed in manuscript form, and were known and performed, despite the ban. Hand-written variations of Vedel's music appeared, but conductors amended scores to make them more suitable for unauthorised performances. Tempi were changed and modal textures, the level of complexity of the music, and the formal structure, were all altered. The hand copying of Vedel's music led to the creation of versions that were notably different from his original scores.

Vedel's compositions were rediscovered during the early 20th century by the conductor and composer Alexander Koshetz, at that time the leader of the Kyiv-Mohyla Academy's student choir, and himself a student. They were first published in 1902. Koshetz, one of the earliest conductors from Ukraine to attempt to revive performances of Vedel using the autograph scores, noted that "the great technical difficulties of solo parts... and the need for large choruses" made his works difficult to perform in public. Koshetz toured Europe and America, conducting the Ukrainian Republican Chapel in performances of Vedel.

Koshetz's revival of Vedel's music was banned by the Soviets after Ukraine was absorbed into the Soviet Union in 1922. Unlike many of the sacred works written by Western composers, Orthodox sacred music is sung in the vernacular, and its religious nature is visible and tangible to Orthodox Christians. Because of this, Soviet anti-religious legislation prohibited Russian and Ukrainian sacred music from being performed in public from 1928 until well into the 1950s, when the Khrushchev Thaw occurred, and Vedel's works were once again heard by Soviet audiences.

The gap of nearly two centuries when Vedel's music was forgotten adversely affected the development of Ukrainian church music. Vedel made an important contribution to late 18th-century music, but his accomplishments were largely undocumented and so were not realised. Early attempts to produce a narrative of Vedel's life and work based on the recollections of his contemporaries were only begun after they themselves had died, and this led to contradictory accounts of his life. The most important studies about Vedel produced in 19th and early 20th centuries belonged to musicologists as Askochensky, Vasily Metalov, Vladimir Stasov, and Pyotr Turchaninov. Some of these authors, such as Askochensky, were representatives of the Russian national movement; according to Igor Tylyk and Oksana Dondyk, the historical studies of these authors were distorted to suit their particular views about Ukrainian politics and music.

=== Recognition ===
Vedel, Berezovsky and Bortniansky are recognised by modern scholars as the "Golden Three" composers of Ukrainian classical music during the end of the 18th century, and the outstanding composers at a time when church music was reaching its peak in eastern Europe. They composed some of the greatest choral music to emerge from the Russian Empire.

Vedel made an important contribution in the music history of Ukraine, and musicologists consider him to the archetypal composer of the baroque style in Ukrainian music. Koshetz stated that Vedel should be seen as "the first and greatest spokesperson of the national substance in Ukrainian church music". The musical culture that developed in Ukraine during the 19th century was founded in part on Vedel's choral compositions. According to the ethnomusicologist Taras Filenko, "His free command of contemporary techniques of choral writing, combined with innovations in adapting the particularities of Ukrainian melody, make Artem Vedel's works a unique phenomenon in the context of world musical culture." According to Chekan, Vedel's texture is "at times monumental and at others subtly contrasted, strikingly showing the possibilities of the a cappella sound".

A memorial plaque to Vedel was made by the sculptor Igor Grechanyk in 2008. The plaque is located on the wall of the Kyiv-Mohyla Academy. The Vedel School in Lviv, a school of contemporary music founded in 2017 by the musician Mikhail Balog, was named in honour of the composer. There are streets named after the composer in Kyiv and Kharkiv.

== Sources ==
- Alwes, Chester L. (2016). A History of Western Choral Music. Vol. 2. Oxford: Oxford University Press. ISBN 978-0-19-937701-5.
- van Boer, Bertil (2012). Historical Dictionary of Music. Plymouth: Scarecrow Press. ISBN 978-0-8108-7183-0.
- Fairclough, Pauline (2012). ""Don't Sing It on a Feast Day": The Reception and Performance of Western Sacred Music in Soviet Russia, 1917–1953". Journal of the American Musicological Society. 65 (1). University of California Press: 67–111. doi:10.1525/jams.2012.65.1.67. JSTOR 10.1525/jams.2012.65.1.67.
- Filenko, Taras (2018). Artem Vedel: Twelve Sacred Choral Concerti & Divine Liturgy of St. John Chrysostom (PDF) (in English and Ukrainian). Halifax, Canada: Leaf Music Inc.
- Hamm, Michael F. (1993). Kiev: A Portrait, 1800–1917. Princeton, New Jersey: Princeton University Press. ISBN 978-1-4008-5151-5 – via Internet Archive.
- Katchanovski, Ivan; Kohut, Zenon E.; Nebesio, Bohdan Y.; Yurkevich, Myroslav (2013). Historical Dictionary of Ukraine (2nd ed.). Plymouth: Scarecrow Press. ISBN 978-0-8108-7847-1.
- Korniy, Lydia Pylypyvna (1998). Історія української музики [History of Ukrainian Music] (in Ukrainian). Vol. 2. Kharkiv; New York: P. Kotz. OCLC 978701286.
- Magocsi, Paul Robert (2010). A History of Ukraine: The Land and Its Peoples (2nd ed.). Toronto: University of Toronto Press. ISBN 978-1-4426-1021-7.
- Potemkin, E.L. (2017). Биографический Словарь Высшие Чины Российской Империи (22.10.1721–2.03.1917) [Biographical Dictionary of the Highest Ranks of the Russian Empire (22.10.1721–2.03.1917)] (in Russian). Vol. 2. Moscow.
- Ritzarev, Marina (2016). Eighteenth-century Russian Music. Abingdon, UK; New York: Routledge. ISBN 978-0-7546-3466-9.
- Sonevytsky, Ihor (1966). Artem Vedelʹ i ĭoho muzychna spadshchyna [Artem Vedel and his Musical Heritage] (in Ukrainian). New York: Ukrainian Academy of Arts and Sciences in the United States. OCLC 12901903.
- Tylyk, Igor (2016). "Хронотопічно-стильові параметри творчості Артемія Веделя" [Chronotopic and Stylistic Parameters of Artemy Vedel's Work]. Scientific Herald of Tchaikovsky National Music Academy of Ukraine (in Ukrainian) (117): 181–194 – via VNLU.
- Tylyk, Igor; Dondyk, Oksana (2018). "Формування науково-аналітичних параметрів вивчення творчості Артема Веделя крізь призму музикознавчо-текстологічних досліджень другої половини ХІХ – середини ХХ століття" [Formation of Scientific and Analytical Parameters of Studying the Work of Artem Wedel through the Prism of Musicological and Textological Research of the second half of the XIX – middle of the XX century]. Scientific Notes (in Ukrainian and English). 2 (39). Ternopil Volodymyr Hnatiuk National Pedagogical University: 57–66. ISSN 2411-3271. Archived from the original on 20 March 2022.
