= Ozyorsky =

Ozyorsky or Ozersky (masculine), Ozyorskaya/Ozerskaya (feminine), or Ozyorskoye/Ozerskoye (neuter) may refer to:

== People ==
- Alexander Dmitrievich Ozersky (1813-1880) Russian military geologist
- Joshua Ozersky (1967–2015), American food writer and historian

== Places ==
- Ozyorsky District, several districts in Russia
- Ozyorsky Urban Okrug, several urban okrugs in Russia
- Ozyorskoye Urban Settlement, a former municipal formation which the town of district significance of Ozyorsk in Ozyorsky District of Kaliningrad Oblast, Russia was incorporated as
- Ozyorsky (rural locality) (Ozyorskaya, Ozyorskoye), several rural localities in Russia

== See also ==
- Ozyory, several inhabited localities in Russia
