= Choral concerto =

Genre of sacred choral music

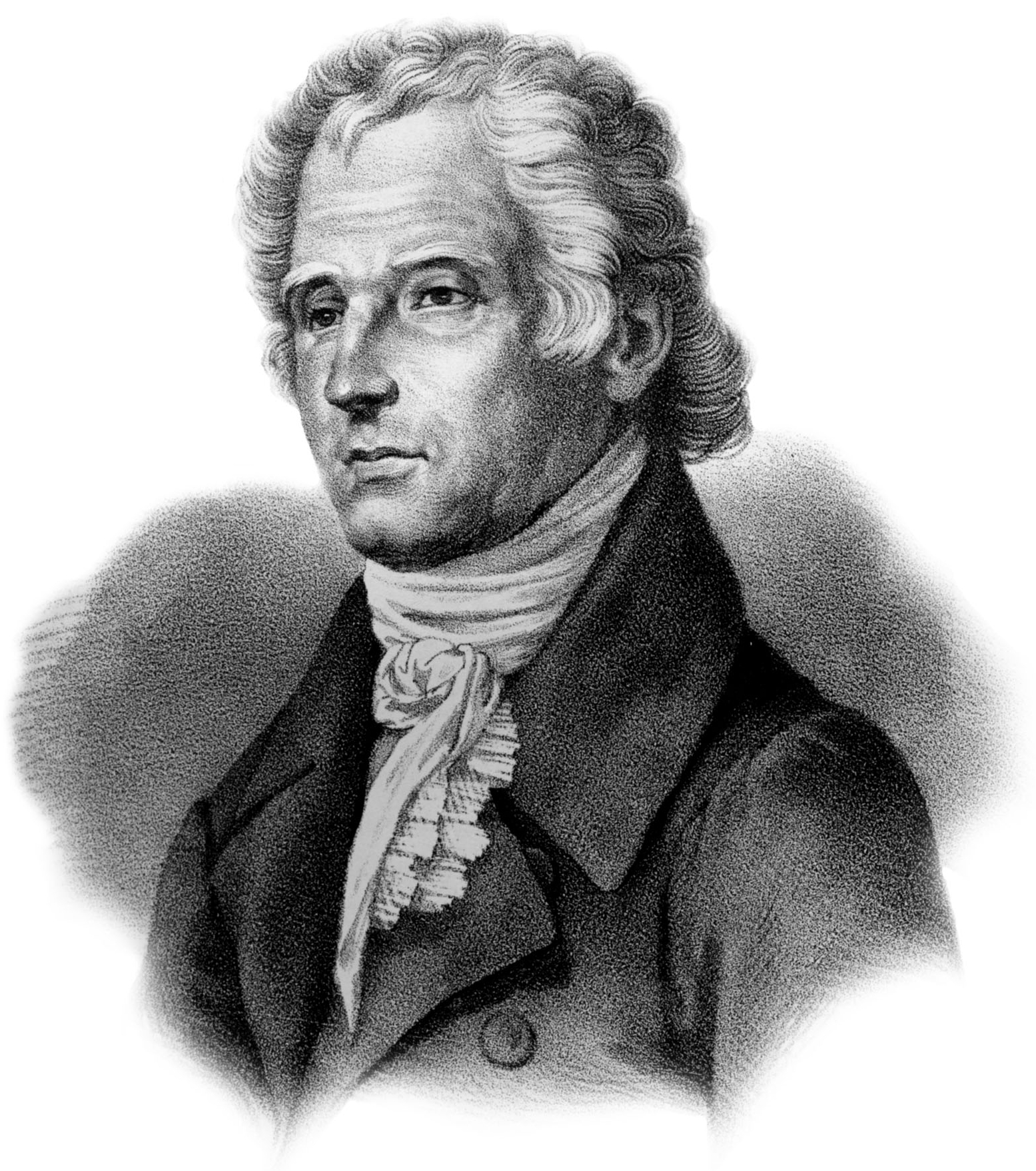
Dmitry Bortniansky (1751–1825) was the most prolific composer of choral concertos.

The choral concerto (Russian: хоровой концерт, romanized: khorovoy kontsert, Ukrainian: Хоровий концерт, romanized: khorovyi kontsert), occasionally known as vocal concerto or church concerto) is a genre of sacred music which arose in the Russian Empire in the middle of the seventeenth century and remained popular into the early nineteenth century. Choral concertos are short compositions for unaccompanied voices, typically containing multiple and distinct sections, with occasional soloistic interludes. The text of the compositions was usually selected from the psalms and other biblical texts, with occasional settings from feast day sequences. Choral concertos were intended for liturgical use; they were sung at the point in the Divine Liturgy when clergy were taking Holy Communion, before the Communion of the faithful.

Despite their name, they do not necessarily have to conform to the concerto style in Western classical music. The works were extremely varied in style, incorporating such diverse elements as folk music, popular song, dance, and march music; this adaptability contributed to the longevity and popularity of the choral concerto as a genre.

== Background ==
Eastern Christian liturgical music has ancient Byzantine roots, with a particular focus on chants. Traditions such as Russian Znamenny chant, Ukrainian Kievan chant, and Carpatho-Rusyn Prostopinije are unique within Christendom, and are a distinguishing feature of Russian, Ukrainian, and Carpatho-Rusyn liturgical music.

The sacred chants and the polyphony (multi-part singing) found in much folk and secular music were difficult to reconcile. The Eastern Churches eventually relaxed their restrictions on the performance of polyphonic chant, and multi-part church music began to develop in the seventeenth century. However, the Greek Orthodox Church ban on the use of musical instruments in church remained in effect. This prohibition was a result of a desire to remain faithful to the ancient Byzantine tradition of a cappella singing.

In the long eighteenth century, Orthodox church music in the Russian Empire underwent a period of Westernisation; the near-ubiquity of Italian music contributed to this, as did the transmission of polyphonic singing from Catholic Poland and Lithuania to Orthodox Christians and Byzantine Catholics in Ukraine and Russia. The popularity of this music, as well as the widespread acceptance of polyphonic church music, led to an almost complete cessation in the use of traditional chant.

Rising nationalism contributed to a deeper interest in folk music, from both ideological and aesthetic viewpoints. The eighteenth century saw the adoption of folk tunes into so-called "high genres", such as symphonies, cantatas, oratorios and opera seria. However, the desire to create a high "para-liturgical" genre, comparable with Western European masses, requiems and passions, remained unfulfilled.

=== Development ===
The genre of choral concertos developed out of the ban on the use of instruments, the rise of polyphony as the premiere form of vocal music, the near-demise of traditional chant, and the demands by the Imperial Russian court for "high art" in sacred music. Blending popular spiritual songs with elements from Western Classical music, polyphony became a unique form with "no substitute or alternative". While it evolved in Russia, due to the presence of Italian as well as Italian-trained court composers, polyphony and the choral concerto have also been called "entirely Western... at odds with the character of previous Russian music".

== Composers ==
Choral concertos enjoyed their first period of popularity in the 1760s, during the Russian Enlightenment. Maxim Berezovsky was the earliest prominent composer of the form, contributing at least 18 concertos to the repertoire. Other composers included Stepan Degtyarev, four of whose concertos are still performed today. Artemy Vedel composed many choral concertos, the best known being Na rekakh Vavilonskikh ("By the waters of Babylon").

The most prolific composer of choral concertos was Dmitry Bortniansky, who had studied in Italy. He composed 35 concertos for single chorus, 10 concertos for double chorus, and 14 "concerto-like" settings of Tyebe Boga hvalim (the same prayer called in the West "Te Deum"). Pyotr Ilyich Tchaikovsky, tasked with editing Bortniansky 's vast oeuvre in 1881, ruefully asked "O, this Bortniansky! Why did he write so much?!" Bortniansky composed throughout the 1780s and 1790s, becoming a master of the highly adaptable nature of the genre. His final concertos, composed in the 1810s, corresponded with the demise of the extreme popularity of the genre.

Contributions to the field were limited after Bortniansky's death. Alexei Lvov composed 5 choral concertos, none of which are well-known today. However, he did set several Lenten texts in a manner which linked Bortniansky's style with an early Romantic sensibility. Alexander Arkhangelsky composed 20 concertos in a similar "emotionally charged style".

Pavel Chesnokov, Alexander Kastalsky, Alexander Gretchaninov, Maximilian Steinberg, and Sergei Rachmaninoff were among the many late Tsarist and early Soviet-era composers who continued the tradition of choral concertos. Under their capacity, the form expanded in expressiveness and proportion.

== Later choral concertos ==
A number of later Russian composers paid homage to the old-fashioned style of choral concertos. A selected list is provided.

- 1911: Passion Week by Pavel Grechaninov
- 1921-1926: Passion Week by Maximilian Steinberg.
- 1970: Lebyodushka, Vadim Salmanov. Won the state Glinka Prize.
- 1973: Concerto in Memory of Alexander Yurlov, Georgy Sviridov.
- 1984-85: Concerto for Mixed Chorus, Alfred Schnittke. Sung to texts drawn from Armenian Prayer book of Saint Gregory of Narek.
- 1990: Psalmus poenitentialis, Vladimir Tarnopolsky. Based on Catholic themes.
