= Maximilian Steinberg =

Russian classical music composer (1883–1946)

- Максимилиан Штейнберг
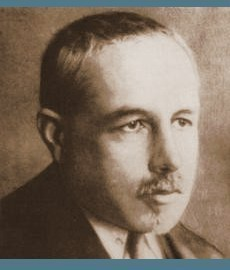
- Maximilian Steinberg in 1915
- Born: 4 July 1883 [O.S. 22 June] Vilna, Russian Empire
- Died: 6 December 1946 (aged 63); Leningrad, Soviet Union
- Occupation: Composer

Maximilian Osseyevich Steinberg (Russian: Максимилиан Осеевич Штейнберг; 4 July 1883 [O.S. 22 June] – 6 December 1946) was a Russian composer of classical music.

Steinberg is less known today than his mentor (and father-in-law) Nikolai Rimsky-Korsakov, his rival Igor Stravinsky, or his student protege Dmitri Shostakovich.

In 2014, Steinberg's choral concerto Passion Week was rediscovered and performed for the first time. It was instantly praised as a masterpiece by both lovers and performers of Classical music. This has triggered a revival of interest in the life and music of Maximilian Steinberg.

== Life ==
Steinberg was born into a Lithuanian Jewish family in Vilna, Russian Empire (present-day Vilnius, Lithuania). His father, Osey (Hosea) Steinberg (Joshua Steinberg), was a leading scholar of Hebrew. In 1901, he went to Saint Petersburg, to study biology at the university there. He graduated in 1906. In the meantime he also started studying at the Saint Petersburg Conservatory. He entered Anatoly Lyadov's harmony class, moving on to Nikolai Rimsky-Korsakov's harmony class and Alexander Glazunov's counterpoint class. His considerable talent in composition soon became clear, encouraged especially by his mentor Rimsky-Korsakov. He graduated from the Conservatory in 1908. Fellow student Igor Stravinsky resented the apparent favoring of Steinberg by Rimsky-Korsakov over him. Nevertheless, Steinberg named Stravinsky as one of his closest school friends when the latter had made a big name in the West, which Stravinsky resented even more.

Steinberg was considered first as a great hope of Russian music but refused to imitate Stravinsky and other modern composers, instead preferring the 19th-century music of the Mighty Handful. Steinberg composed with firm control and brilliant orchestration, noted often about his music.

In 1908, Steinberg was baptized into the Russian Orthodox Church and married his mentor's daughter, Nadezhda Rimskaya-Korsakova. Steinberg's father-in-law died the same year, and Steinberg edited and completed his Principles of Orchestration, which was later published in Paris.

At the conservatory, Steinberg first became a lecturer, then in 1915, Professor of Composition and Orchestration, the position that Rimsky-Korsakov had held. He remained in that post during the October Revolution and subsequent Russian Civil War.

Composer Dmitri Shostakovich began studying at the Conservatory as a 13-year-old boy in 1919 and Steinberg tried to guide him in the traditions of the great Russian composers of the 19th century. Ultimately, however, Steinberg was disappointed to see Shostakovich "wasting his talent" by imitating the styles of Stravinsky and Sergei Prokofiev.

Between 1921 and 1926, Steinberg composed Passion Week, a Russian Orthodox choral concerto which is now regarded as a masterpiece. While writing it, Steinberg transformed the Medieval Znamenny chants used to relate the Passion and Death of Jesus Christ during Holy Week by composing sometimes as many as twelve different harmonies at once. Steinberg's decision to write a work of overtly Christian music during the Second Soviet Anti-Religious Campaign was an act that could have had serious consequences for himself and his family.

Steinberg scholar Oksana Lukonina believes that his decision to compose a work of religious music was motivated in part by the events of 1921. The poet Alexander Blok had died after being refused permission to go abroad for medical treatment. Lukonina also sees Steinberg's turn to chant-based choral music as a manifestation of renewed interest in the religious heritage of Russian culture shown by such other artists of the early Soviet period as the painter Mikhail Nesterov and, eventually, the Nobel Prize-winning poet and novelist Boris Pasternak.

In 1923, midway through the composition of Passion Week, the Communist Party of the Soviet Union banned the performance of all music with religious undertones. Upon receiving the news, Steinberg ruefully confided in his diary that he now had no chance of ever hearing Passion Week performed. In the vain hope that choirs in the West might be interested, Steinberg arranged in 1927 for the score to be published by a White emigre firm in Paris. The Paris edition appeared under the title, La Semaine de la Passion d’après les vieux chants religieux russes pour choeur mixte a cappella. Hoping that Passion Week might have wider appeal than just among the Russian diaspora, Steinberg arranged for the Paris edition to include translations of the sung text from Old Church Slavonic into both Latin and English.

After the 1920s, however, Steinberg is believed to have never again acted contrary to the Party's wishes.

Steinberg's subsequent music drew upon world literature for its subject matter. The dictates of socialist realism, which began being forced upon Soviet composers in 1932 meant no great changes for Steinberg, as his style was already very similar to the 19th century composers whom Joseph Stalin admired.

As Stalinism tightened its grip, Steinberg drew also on the folk music of the Soviet Union's ethnic minorities, particularly those from Uzbekistan and Turkmenistan. He also let himself be inspired more and more by musical and literary folklore.

Steinberg played an important role in Soviet music life as the teacher of composers Dmitri Shostakovich, Galina Ustvolskaya, Natalia Pravosudovich, Lyubov Streicher, and Yuri Shaporin.

Steinberg held numerous posts at the Conservatory, among others deputy director 1934–39. He retired in 1946.

Shortly before his death, Steinberg was interviewed by an American musical scholar about his past rivalry with Igor Stravinsky. Even though Stravinsky had repeatedly criticized him in the West, Steinberg refused to follow suit.

In what may have been part of a deliberate effort by the Soviet State to convince Stravinsky to return home, Steinberg expressed only admiration for his former rival's talents mixed with regret that Stravinsky had chosen to become an emigre. Steinberg also claimed that Stravinsky's absence from his Motherland was a catastrophic loss for Soviet music and cultural life.

Maximilian Steinberg died in Leningrad on December 6, 1946.

== Legacy ==
Steinberg's first two symphonies have been recorded by Neeme Järvi for the Deutsche Grammophon Gesellschaft. More recently (2016) his 4th symphony and violin concerto were recorded on Dutton Vocalion.

Passion Week, Steinberg's 1926 choral concerto which had been banned by the Soviet Government for being a work of religious music, finally received its world premiere on April 11, 2014, when it was performed at St. Mary's Cathedral in Portland, Oregon by the Orthodox choral ensemble Cappella Romana. In preparation for the premiere, Cappella Romana's director, Alexander Lingas, had traveled to St. Petersburg to examine Steinberg's diary and manuscripts. Lingas' research resulted in a new critical edition of Steinberg's once forgotten work, which was published by Musica Russica. Soon after, Cappella Romana made the premiere recording of Passion Week, which was released as both a CD and vinyl record.

This same critical edition was also used by Clarion Choir, which first performed the work in New York City later in 2014. In a review of the concert for The New York Times, James R. Oestrich wrote, "The work is a treasure. Steinberg's style, with its contrapuntal complexities and its enriched harmonies, is slightly advanced over that of Rachmaninoff, excerpts from whose Liturgy of St. John Chrysostom filled out the Clarion program in lovely fashion. But Steinberg also achieves some of his finest effects with utmost simplicity, as in the female trio that opens The Wise Thief." At the end of his article, Oestrich wrote, "Happily, the Clarion version of the work is being recorded this week, as Cappella Romana’s was in the spring. Truly, however belatedly, Steinberg's moment has arrived."

The Clarion Choir's CD recording of Passion Week was nominated for a Grammy Award in 2016, but did not win.

In the fall of 2016, Clarion Choir and its director, Stephen Fox, gave Passion Week its Russian premiere, with performances in both Moscow and St. Petersburg.

== Partial list of works ==
- For orchestra
  - Symphony No. 1 in D major, Op. 3 (1905/06)
  - Symphony No. 2 in B-flat minor, Op. 8 "In memoriam Nikolai Rimsky-Korsakov" (1909)
  - Symphony No. 3 in G minor, Op. 18 (1928)
  - Symphony No. 4 "Turksib" in C major, Op. 24 (1933)
  - Symphony No. 5 "Symphonic Rhapsody on Uzbek Themes", Op. 31 (1942)
  - Variations for Large Orchestra in G major, Op. 2 (1905)
  - Symphonic Prelude "in memoriam Nikolai Rimsky-Korsakov", Op. 7 (1908)
  - Fantaisie dramatique, Op. 9 (1910)
  - Solemn Overture on Revolutionary Songs from 1905–7 and 1917 (1930)
  - In Armenia, Capriccio (1940)
  - "Forward!", heroic Uzbek Overture (1943)
  - Violin concerto (1946. Published 1950.)
- Stage works
  - Metamorphosen, Ballet after Ovid, Op. 10 (1913)
  - Till Eulenspiegel, Ballet (1936)
  - Incidental music
- Vocal music
  - The Water Nymph, Cantata for Soprano, Women's Chorus and Orchestra, Op. 7 (1907)
  - Heaven and Earth for Voice and Orchestra after Byron (1918)
  - Four Songs with Orchestra after Rabindranath Tagore, Op. 14 (1924)
  - Songs
  - Choruses
  - Passion Week, Op. 13 (1923–1927)
- Chamber music
  - String Quartet No. 1 in A, Op. 5 (1907)
  - String Quartet No. 2 in C, Op. 16 (1925)

The eleventh of Nikolai Myaskovsky's symphonies (Op. 34, in B-flat minor) is dedicated to Steinberg. (See Myaskovsky's opus list which also contains a transcription, copyright 1930, by the slightly older composer of Steinberg's third symphony for piano four-hands.)
