= Kharkov Theological Seminary (1840–1917) =

- Харьковская духовная семинария
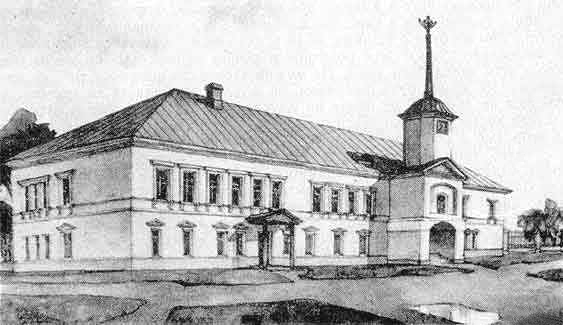

General information
- Status: Demolished
- Location: Kharkov, Russian Empire
- Opened: 1840
- Closed: 1917

The Kharkov Theological Seminary was one of the oldest educational institutions of the Russian Orthodox Church, situated in the Kharkov Governorate in the Russian Empire (now Kharkiv, Ukraine), founded on the basis of the Kharkov Collegium for people from all classes. After the opening of the Kharkov Imperial University (now Karazin University), the collegium was closed, and the teaching staff was transferred to the newly established seminary with a six-year term of study for persons of the clergy.

John the Apostle was named the heavenly patron of the seminary.

== History ==
In 1726, Bishop Epiphanius of Belgorod, at the request of Prince Mikhail Golitsyn, transferred the Slavic-Greek-Latin theological school, founded in 1721 and located at the St. Nikolaus Belgorod Monastery, to the town of Kharkov. In 1734, the school, which was supposed to teach representatives of all classes, received the status of Collegium. In 1817, the Kharkov Collegium was transformed into a third-class seminary for the education of clergy. In 1840, the Collegium was transformed into the Kharkov Theological Seminary with a 6-year term of study. Until 1917, it was located on Kholodnaya Gora on Seminarskaya Street. The stone building in this area was built in 1851 according to the design of the St. Petersburg German-born architect Andrey Ton. In 1917 (see: Russian Revolution) the seminary was closed. In Soviet times, a school of red officers was opened in the seminary building.
