= Ozyory =

Ozyory (Russian: Озёры), also spelled Ozery, is the name of several inhabited localities in Russia.

- Ozyory, Moscow Oblast, a town in Moscow Oblast, administratively incorporated as a town under oblast jurisdiction
- Ozery, Tver Oblast, a village in Zharkovsky District of Tver Oblast

== See also ==
- Aziory, Populated places in Belarus, whose Russian-language name is Ozyory
