= List of compositions by Artemy Vedel =

Artemy Lukyanovich Vedel (Ukrainian: Ведель Артем Лук'янович; 13 April 1767 – 26 July 1808) was a Ukrainian composer of liturgical music, who made an important contribution in the music history of Ukraine. Together with Maxim Berezovsky and Dmitry Bortniansky, Vedel is recognized as one of the 'Golden Three' composers of 18th century Ukrainian classical music, and one of Russia's greatest choral composers. Musicologists consider him to the archetypal composer of Ukrainian music from the baroque era.

An incomplete list of the known works by Artemy Lukyanovich Vedel ^{(data from the Orthodox Sacred Music Reference Library; V = online video available)}
Original title	Translated title	Description	Notes on composition
Vsenoshchnoe bdenie ("Всеношна")^{V}	All-Night Vigil	All-night vigil	–
Priidite poklonimsia ("Приїдіте, поклонімся") No. 2	Come, let us worship No. 2	–	–
Svete tikhii ("Світе Тихії")^{V} No. 2	Gladsome Light No. 2	–	–
Nyne otpushchaeshi [No. 2]	Lord, now lettest Thou	–	–
Slava v vyshnikh Bogu No. 1	Glory to God in the highest	–	–
Khvalite imia Gospodne [No. 2]	Praise the name of the Lord	–	Text based on Psalm 135:1,21; Psalm 136 1,26
Khvalite imia Gospodne [No. 3]	Praise the name of the Lord	–	Text based on Psalm 135:1,21; Psalm 136:1,26
Ot iunosti moeia	From my youth	–	–
Liturgiia Sv. Ioanna Zlatoustago	Liturgy of St. John Chrysostom	Liturgy	Six parts of the liturgy are found in Vedel's only surviving autograph score.
Sugubaia ekteniia [No. 2]	Augmented Litany	–	–
Kheruvimskaia pesn' [No. 2]	Cherubic Hymn No. 2	–	–
Milost' mira ("Милость мира")^{V} [No. 2]	The grace of peace	–	–
Dostoino est' [No. 2]	It is truly meet	–	–
Otche nash [No. 2]	Our Father	–	–
Otche nash [No. 3]	Our Father	–	–
Da ispolniatsia usta	Let our mouths be filled	–	–
Irmosy Rozhdestvu Khristovu	The Heirmoi [of the Kanon] of the Nativity of Christ	–	–
Kanon Sv. Paskhi	The [Heirmoi of the] Kanon of Pascha	–	–
Kto est' sei Tsar' slavy?	Who is this King of glory?	–	–
Ne otvrati litsa Tvoego ("Не відврати обличчя Твого")^{V}	Hide not Thy face	–	–
Plachu i rydaiu	I weep and lament	–	–
Pokaianiia otverzi mi dveri ("Покаяния отверзи ми двери")	To repentance open the path^{V}	–	–
Razboinika blagorazumnago	The wise thief	Trio	–
Blagoslovliu Gospoda vrazumivshago mia	I will bless the Lord Who gives me counsel	Choral concerto	–
Bozhe, priidosha iazytsy v dostoianie Tvoe	O God, the heathen have come into Thy inheritance	Choral concerto	Text based on Psalm 79
Bozhe, zakonoprestupnitsy vozstasha na mia ("Боже мой, законопреступницы восташа на мя")	O God, the proud are risen against me^{V}	Choral concerto	Choral concerto No. 11, text from Psalm 86:14: I. Andante; II. Allegro affetuso; III. Adagio; IV. Allegro assai
Dnes' Vladyka tvari	Today the Lord of creation^{V}	Choral concerto	–
Dokole, Gospodi, zabudeshi mia do kontsa ("Доколе, Господи, забудеши мя")	How long wilt Thou forget me?^{V}	Choral concerto	–
Glasom moim	I cried unto the Lord with my voice^{V}	Choral concerto	Text based on Psalm 142
Gospodi Bozhe moi, na Tia upovakh	O Lord my God, in Thee have I put my trust	Choral concerto	–
K Tebe, Gospodi, vozzovu	To Thee, O Lord, I call	Choral concerto	–
Na rekakh Vavilonskikh [No. 1]	By the waters of Babylon^{V?}	Choral concerto	Text based on Psalm 137
Na rekakh Vavilonskikh [No. 2]	By the waters of Babylon	Choral concerto	Text based on Psalm 137
Pomilui mia, Gospodi, iako nemoshchen esm'	Have mercy upon me, O Lord, for I am afflicted	Choral concerto	Text from Psalm 6: I. Adagio; II Allegro; III Adagio; IV Allegro vivace etc.
Skazhi mi, Gospodi, konchinu moiu	Lord, let me know my end	Choral concerto	–
Slyshi, dshchi, i vizhd'	Hear, O daughter, and consider	Choral concerto	–
Ty moja kripos't' Hospedy (Gospodi)	Thou art my strength, O Lord^{V}	Choral concerto	–
Uslyshi, Gospodi, glas moi	Hear, O Lord, when I cry aloud	Choral concerto	"Услыши Господи глас мой" is dated 6 October 1796
Velichaia velichaiu Tia, Gospodi ("Величая величаю Тя, Господи")^{V}	Magnifying, I magnify Thee, O Lord	–	–
Vsemirnuiu slavu	Let us praise the Glory of the world	–	–
Zastupnik moi esi	My rock, why hast Thou forgotten me?	–	–
Tebe Boga khvalim	We praise Thee, O God	–	
V molitvakh neusypaiushchuiu Bogoroditsu ("В молитвах нeусипающую Богородицу")	The Birthgiver of God^{V} who is constant in supplications	Choral concerto	1 of 12 choral pieces in Vedel's only surviving autograph score. External link - YT
Spasy mya, Bozhe, yako vnydosha vody ("Спаси мя, Боже, яко внидоша води")	Save me, O God,^{V} for the waters are come	Choral concerto	2 of 12 choral pieces in Vedel's only surviving autograph score.
("Доколі, Господи, забудеши мя")	How long, O Lord,^{V} wilt thou forget me	Choral concerto	3 of 12 choral pieces in Vedel's only surviving autograph score.
("Пою Богу моєму, пою дондеже єсм")	I will praise the Lord while I live^{V}	Choral concerto	4 of 12 choral pieces in Vedel's only surviving autograph score.
("Блажен разуміваяй на нища і убога")	Blessed is he that considers the poor^{V}	Choral concerto	5 of 12 choral pieces in Vedel's only surviving autograph score.
("Помилуй мя, Господи, яко немощен єсм")	Have mercy on me, O Lord,^{V} for I am weak	Choral concerto	6 of 12 choral pieces in Vedel's only surviving autograph score.
("Воскресни, Господи, да судятся язици пред Тобою")	Arise, O Lord,^{V} let the gentiles be judged in thy sight	Choral concerto	7 of 12 choral pieces in Vedel's only surviving autograph score.
("Услиши, Господи, глас мой")	Hear, O Lord,^{V} my voice	Choral concerto	8 of 12 choral pieces in Vedel's only surviving autograph score, completed in Kharkiv, October–November 1796.
("Проповідника віри і слугу слова")	(To the Apostle Andrew): A preacher of the faith^{V} and a servant of the Word	Choral concerto	9 of 12 choral pieces in Vedel's only surviving autograph score, completed in Kharkiv, October–November 1796. Composed for two choirs.
("Господь пасет мя")	The Lord is my shepherd^{V}	Choral concerto	10 of 12 choral pieces in Vedel's only surviving autograph score, written in Kharkiv in 1796.
("Боже законоприступницы восташа на мя"	O God, the wicked are risen up against me^{V}	Choral concerto	11 of 12 choral pieces in Vedel's only surviving autograph score, written 11 November 1798, after his return from Kharkiv). Performed in the Kyiv Fraternal Epiphany and St. Sophia Cathedrals.
("Ко Господу, внегда скорбіти ми")	In my trouble I cried to the Lord^{V}	Choral concerto	The last of 12 choral pieces in Vedel's only surviving autograph score, written after he returned to Kyiv in 1798.
("Воскресни Боже")	Resurrect God	–	–
("Господь пасет мя")	The Lord Feeds Me	two-choir concerto	The concerto was written in Kharkiv.
("Покаянія отверзи ми двери")	Repentance We Open the Door	one of six trios	–
("Ко Господу всегда скорбыти ми")	To the Lord we always mourn	Choral concerto	Performed in 1798 in the Kyiv Fraternal Epiphany and St. Sophia Cathedrals.
–	Easter canon^{V}	–	–
("Херувимская песнь^{V} III")	Cherubic Hymn No. 3	–	–
("Доколе Господи") No. 2^{V}	–	Choral concerto	–
–	The Lord ruleth me.	Choral concerto for two choirs	–
–	2 concertos in honour of the Virgin Mary; concerto on Christ's Passion	Choral concertos	–
–	Now lettest Thou depart^{V}	–	–

== Sources ==
- Filenko, Taras (2018). Artem Vedel: Twelve Sacred Choral Concerti & Divine Liturgy of St. John Chrysostom (PDF) (in English and Ukrainian). Halifax, Canada: Leaf Music Inc.
- Sonevytsky, Igor (1966). Artem Vedelʹ i ĭoho muzychna spadshchyna [Artem Vedel and his Musical Heritage] (in Ukrainian). New York: Ukrainian Academy of Arts and Sciences in the United States. OCLC 12901903.
