= Tamara Bulat =

Ukrainian-American musicologist (1933–2004)

- Born: 3 February 1933; Zaporizhia, Ukrainian SSR, Soviet Union
- Died: 24 August 2004 (aged 71); Edison, New Jersey, U.S.
- Occupation: Musicologist

Tamara P Bulat was a Ukrainian-American musicologist. She is well known for her publications on the work of Ukrainian composers Mykola Lysenko and Yakiv Stepovy, as well as the topics of folk versus art music, culturology, and ethnomusicology. The author of several monographs and 300 papers, she is a co-author of The History of Ukrainian Music in 6 volumes. Bulat was associated with at the M. Ryl’s’ky Institute for Art, Folklore and Ethnology of the National Academy of Sciences of Ukraine, worked at the Kyiv Conservatory and at the Institute of Culture (Kyiv).

== Life and career ==
Tamara P Bulat was born on 3 February 1933. She worked at various institutions, including the M. Ryl’s’ky Institute for Art, a professor of Folklore and Ethnology of the National Academy of Sciences of Ukraine, at working at both the Kyiv Conservatory and the Institute of Culture (Kyiv). In her later years, Dr. Bulat was a member of the Composers’ Society of Ukraine, of the Ukrainian Academy of Arts and Sciences in the USA (a Full Member and an elected officer), the Ukrainian Music Institute of America, the Society for Ethnomusicology (USA), and of the Shevchenko Scientific Society (USA). Bulat died in Edison, New Jersey on 24 August 2004.

Bulat published several monographs and over 300 papers Some of these were with her son, the musicologist Taras Filenko, including The World of Mykola Lysenko on the composer Mykola Lysenko. In addition to Lysenko, Bulat wrote on Yakiv Stepovy, folk versus art music, culturology, and ethnomusicology. Among her major publications was as the co-author as the six volume survey, The History of Ukrainian Music.

== Selected publications ==
- Filenko, Taras; Bulat, Tamara (2001). The World of Mykola Lysenko: Ethnic Identity, Music, and Politics in Nineteenth-Century Ukraine. Edmonton: Ukraine Millennium Foundation. ISBN 978-966-530-045-8.
