= Ozyorsky Urban Okrug =

Location of Chelyabinsk Oblast in Russia

Location of Kaliningrad Oblast in Russia

Ozyorsky Urban Okrug is the name of several municipal formations in Russia. The following administrative divisions are incorporated as such:

- Town of Ozyorsk, Chelyabinsk Oblast
- Ozyorsky District, Kaliningrad Oblast

== See also ==
- Ozyorsky (disambiguation)
