= Ozyorsky District =

Ozyorsky District is the name of several administrative and municipal districts in Russia.

Modern districts

Location of Kaliningrad Oblast in Russia

- Ozyorsky District, Kaliningrad Oblast, an administrative district of Kaliningrad Oblast

Former districts

Location of Moscow Oblast in Russia

- Ozyorsky District, Moscow Oblast, a former administrative and municipal district of Moscow Oblast, which existed until May 2015

== See also ==
- Ozyorsky (disambiguation)
