= Kharkiv Collegium =

Historic educational establishment in Kharkiv

Kharkov Collegium
- Харьковский коллегиум
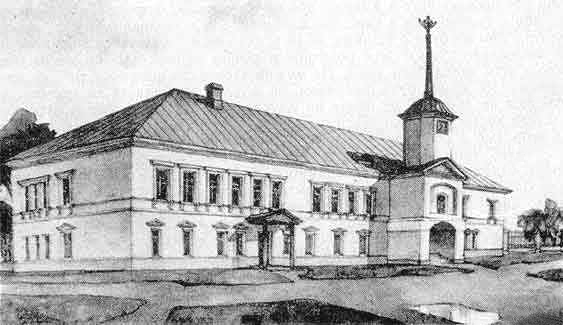
- Former names: Belgorod Slavic School; Tikhorian Academy

General information
- Status: Demolished
- Location: Kharkov, Russian Empire
- Opened: 1721
- Closed: 1817

The Kharkov Collegium also known as Kharkiv Collegium or Kharkiv College (from 1721 to 1726 Belgorod Slavic School) was an educational institution in the Kharkov Governorate in the Russian Empire (now Kharkiv, Ukraine), which was founded in 1721, due to collaboration of Bishop Epiphanius of Belgorod and Prince Mikhail Golitsyn. As a great supporter of the Collegium was also known Prince Dmitry Golitsyn, whose monument stood in the central hall of the Collegium. The Kharkіv Collegium was closed in 1817 and was re-organised as the Kharkov Theological Seminary, a higher educational institution of the Russian Orthodox Church, training clergy, teachers, scholars, and officials.

== History ==
=== Name ===
Today the institution is mostly referred to as the Kharkov or Kharkiv Collegium, but at the beginning of the 18th century, academics in the Left Bank of Ukraine traditionally named educational institutions in honour of the founders. The Kharkiv Collegium was also named the Tikhorian Academy in honour of its co-founder Epiphanius, who served as a Bischof of the Diocese of Belgorod.

=== Foundation ===
The Collegium was founded in 1721 in the city of Belgorod, Russia, and in 1726 (according to the decision of Anna of Russia) was transferred to Kharkiv under the name of the Slavic-Greek-Latin School (cf. also with Slavic Greek Latin Academy). In 1734 it was transformed into the Kharkiv Collegium for children of all social classes on the model of the Kyiv-Mohyla Academy. The founders of the Kharkiv Collegium were Bishop Epiphanius Tikhorsky of Belgorod and Prince Mikhail Golitsyn. It was the second most important educational and scientific centre in Ukraine after the Kyiv-Mohyla Academy and the third one collegium in the history of the Russian Empire.

The formation of the Kharkiv Collegium was facilitated by the broad charitable support of various segments of the population of Sloboda Ukraine, thanks to which it developed significant land and economic holdings. Its wealth made it possible to teach and maintain a large number of students—up to 400 in the middle of the 18th century, and double that number in the early 19th century.

=== Curriculum ===
The curriculum, which was similar to that of the Kyiv-Mohyla Academy and of Moscow University, involved the teaching of poetry, rhetoric, philosophy, theology, Greek, Latin and Russian.

In 1769, in order to prepare the children of the nobility for public service, "additional classes" were opened at the Collegium. Subjects introduced at this time included engineering, artillery, music, dance, drawing, art, and architecture, mathematics, history, geography, and other languages. Additional classes were located outside the monastery (on the site of the Volodymyr Korolenko Library). In 1789 they were separated from the Collegium and merged with the People's School, and after the founding of Kharkiv University, they became the Sloboda-Ukrainian Gymnasium. In 1795, physics and science were introduced into the curriculum, and in the early 19th century, agriculture and medicine were added.

The first principal of the architectural class was Ivan Sablukov. Maxim Kalinovsky and Petro Yaroslavsky, both graduates of the college and students of the architect Vasyl Bazhenov, went on to teach the subject at the college. Teaching was modelled on the architectural class of the St. Petersburg Academy of Arts. The classes stopped running in 1789.

=== Closure ===
From the beginning of the 19th century until the founding of Kharkiv University (now National University of Kharkiv) (the first students of which were students of the Kharkov Collegium), the college lost its importance. In 1817, due to church reforms carried out by the Russian Empire, it was transformed into Kharkiv Theological Seminary. The Collegium library became the first in the city and in 1840 the library of the Kharkiv Theological Seminary included already five thousand books.

== Sources ==
- Kagamlyk, S. (2018). An Ethnosocial Portrait of Ukrainian Orthodox Hierarchs against the background of the Enlightenment. Ethnic History of the Peoples of Europe. pp. 73–81.
- Tishchenko, O.I.; Kondel-Perminova, N.M. (1995). "Architectural Class Art of Ukraine". In Kudrytsky, A.V. (ed.). Ukrainian Encyclopedia. Vol. 1. p. 109.
- Посохова, Людмила: Православные коллегиумы Российской империи на пересечении культур, традиций, эпох (конец XVII—начало XIX веков). Москва 2016. 550 С.

=== Further reading ===
- Bagalei, D. (1895). Encyclopedic Dictionary of Brockhaus and Efron (in Russian). Vol. XVa. pp. 694–695.
- Fedorovsky, D. (1863). Essay on the History of the Kharkov Collegium (in Russian). pp. 23, 24, 27, 50.
- Lyubzhin, A.I. (2008). "Kharkov Collegium in the 19th–early 20th centuries: questions of education". Journal of Educational Issues (in Russian) (3): 240–263. ISSN 1814-9545. Archived from the original on 18 May 2022.
- Posokhova, L. (2011). At the Crossroads of Cultures, Traditions, Epochs: Orthodox colleges of Ukraine in the late 19th–early 20th centuries (in Russian).
- Posokhova, L. (2013). "Харківський колегіум" [Kharkiv Collegium] (PDF). In Smoliy, Valeriy A. (ed.). Encyclopedia of History of Ukraine (in Ukrainian). Vol. 10. Institute of History of Ukraine, National Academy of Sciences of Ukraine. pp. 356–358. ISBN 978-966-00-1359-9.
- Smoliy, Valeriy A., ed. (1997). Small Dictionary of the History of Ukraine (PDF) (in Ukrainian). Kyiv: Lybid. p. 426. ISBN 5-325-00781-5.
