= Andrei Levanidov =

Russian soldier and administrator (1747–1802)

Andrei Yakovlevich Levanidov
- Андрей Яковлевич Леванидов
- Born: 1747
- Died: 26 February 1802 (aged 54–55)
- Military career
- Allegiance: Russian Empire
- Rank: Lieutenant general
- Commands: Poltava Pikiner (Light Mounted) Regiment, Corps of the Ukrainian Army, Little Russian Corps
- Conflicts: Russo-Turkish War (1768–1774); Russo-Turkish War (1787–1792); Polish–Russian War of 1792; Kościuszko Uprising

Andrei Yakovlevich Levanidov (1747 – 26 February 1802) was a Russian soldier and administrator.

== Sources ==
- Volkov, S.V. (2009). Generals of the Russian Empire: an encyclopedia of generals and admirals from Peter I to Nicholas II. Vol. 2.
