= Ozyorsky (rural locality) =

Ozyorsky (Russian: Озёрский; masculine), Ozyorskaya (Озёрская; feminine), or Ozyorskoye (Озёрское; neuter), alternatively spelled Ozersky (Озерский), Ozerskaya (Озерская), or Ozerskoye (Озерское), is the name of several rural localities in Russia:

- Ozersky, Kursk Oblast, a settlement under the administrative jurisdiction of the work settlement of Kirovsky, Pristensky District, Kursk Oblast
- Ozersky, Verkhnedonskoy District, Rostov Oblast, a khutor in Tubyanskoye Rural Settlement of Verkhnedonskoy District of Rostov Oblast
- Ozersky, Zimovnikovsky District, Rostov Oblast, a khutor in Verkhneserebryakovskoye Rural Settlement of Zimovnikovsky District of Rostov Oblast
- Ozerskoye, Kaluga Oblast, a selo in Kozelsky District of Kaluga Oblast
- Ozyorskoye, Leningrad Oblast, a logging depot settlement under the administrative jurisdiction of Kamennogorskoye Settlement Municipal Formation, Vyborgsky District, Leningrad Oblast
- Ozerskoye, Moscow Oblast, a village in Kvashenkovskoye Rural Settlement of Taldomsky District of Moscow Oblast
- Ozerskoye, Nizhny Novgorod Oblast, a village in Nakhratovsky Selsoviet of Voskresensky District of Nizhny Novgorod Oblast
- Ozyorskoye, Sakhalin Oblast, a selo in Korsakovsky District of Sakhalin Oblast
- Ozerskaya, Kaluga Oblast, a village in Zhizdrinsky District of Kaluga Oblast
- Ozerskaya, Kirov Oblast, a village under the administrative jurisdiction of the town of Luza, Luzsky District, Kirov Oblast

== See also ==
- Ozerskoy, a railway crossing loop in Zhizdrinsky District of Kaluga Oblast
