= Taras Filenko =

Ukrainian musician (born 1958)

- Born: October 1, 1958 (age 67); Zaporizhzhia, Ukraine
- Genres: Classical, Slavic
- Occupations: Ethnomusicologist, writer, lecturer, musician
- Instrument: Piano
- Years active: 1983–present

Taras Filenko (Ukrainian: Тарас Філенко) (born 1 October 1958) is an ethnomusicologist, lecturer, and concert pianist most renowned for his research and proliferation of Ukrainian music history of 19th and early 20th centuries. Dr. Filenko's findings are presented in his Ph.D. dissertation from the Tchaikovsky National Music Academy of Ukraine (1989), his second Ph.D. in ethnomusicology from University of Pittsburgh (1998), and The World of Mykola Lysenko book in English (2000) and Ukrainian (2009). As a two-time recipient of the Fulbright Scholarship, Dr. Filenko has conducted lectures and developed courses at academic institutions throughout Europe and North America focused on the classical and ethnic musical culture of Eastern Europe.

== Biography ==
Dr. Taras Filenko, pianist, organist, and musicologist, studied music in Kiev, Donetsk, Moscow, and Pittsburgh. He was awarded a degree for music specializing in piano performance in 1982, followed in 1989 by an advanced degree (Kand. Nauk), in the history of music from the National Academy of Music of Ukraine (Kiev Conservatory of Music). Filenko earned a second doctorate in ethnomusicology from the University of Pittsburgh in 1998.

Taras Filenko was born to Dr. Tamara Bulat, a world-renowned author, and Yuri Filenko, space scientist. Dr. Filenko is the recipient of both Fulbright and Petesh Scholarships. He has participated in numerous musicological conferences and in international symposia in Belgium, France, Canada, the United States, England, Poland, the Baltic States, Ukraine, Azerbaijan, and Russia. In 1990, Dr. Filenko was invited to Edmonton, Alberta, to conduct research at the Canadian Institute of Ukrainian Studies.

Since 1998, Dr. Filenko is on the faculty of the City Music Center, at Duquesne University. He currently resides in Pittsburgh, PA, where he maintains a private piano studio.

== Education ==
Dr. Filenko's extensive education is not limited to musical topics alone. He participated in the Program for Executives at Carnegie Mellon University and the American-European Seminar in Salzburg, Austria. He also earned a diploma in public administration from the Management Academy in Ukraine.

Dr. Filenko has worked in the fields of history of music, ethnomusicology, and music performance (piano and organ) for over twenty-five years. In 1986, Filenko was appointed to teach Ukrainian music, piano, and piano literature courses at the National Academy of Music in Ukraine. For five years, he also served as a lecturer in the History of Ukrainian Music Department, and, subsequently, for five years as Assistant Dean of the Conducting and Voice Departments. He also worked as a researcher at the Institute of Ukrainian Studies at the National University of Kiev.

Combining his work as a scholar, educator, and performer, Filenko has lectured, taught, and performed internationally. His concert appearances have included venues in Ukraine, England, France, Poland, Germany, Belgium, Austria, Russia, the Baltic states, Serbia, Canada, Costa Rica, and the United States. His recordings include classical music as well as jazz arrangements. His concerts and media appearances have often featured works by contemporary Ukrainian composers.

Dr. Filenko studied piano and musicology at the National Academy of Music in Ukraine. He later achieved his PhD in ethnomusicology from the University of Pittsburgh. Because of his unique knowledge and specialty in the history of Ukrainian music, Taras has been invited to teach and perform at universities in England, France, Poland, Germany, Belgium, Austria, Russia, Yugoslavia, Canada, the Middle East and Asia, in addition to all over the United States.

== Publications ==
Taras has, in addition to direct musical learning, lent a hand in the publication of over 100 different works which "embrace ethnic studies, musical culture, politics, ethno/historical musicology, music, and poetry. His latest work, The World of Mykola Lysenko: Ethnic Identity, Music, and Politics in Nineteenth-Century Ukraine, which features an in-depth look into the life of Mykola Lysenko, has won numerous international awards. In 1989, Taras joined his mother in the publication and research of this book. Supplemented by UMF, the team of Filenko, and Bulat finally printed the book in 2001. It immediately received the "Book of the Year" award from the Publisher's Association of Ukraine. It was also enthusiastically reviewed by the Ukrainian Ministry of Culture. A Ukrainian-language version is in the works, and 2002 was proclaimed Ukraine's "Year of Mykola Lysenko." Taras also wrote a short Introduction to Ukrainian Classical Music at the Ukrainian Cultural and Humanitarian Institute.

== Awards ==
- 1982 – First Prize, Ukrainian National Concerto Competition
- 1983 – First Degree Baltic State Award for Contemporary Musicians
- 1985 – Award for Promotion of Contemporary Music, The Union of Ukrainian Composers
- 1986 – Diploma of the First Degree for Scholarly Papers, International Music Conference, Baku, Azerbaijan
- 1994 – Fulbright Research Post-Doctoral Fellowship
- 1996 – Julia Petesh Scholarship in Historical Musicology
- 1998 – Shevchenko Scientific Society Scholarship
- 2010 – President's Award from the Forum of Publishers, Lviv
