= Treaty of Peterswaldau =

1813 treaty between Great Britain and Russia

The Treaty of Peterswaldau was signed in Peterswaldau on 6 July 1813 between Great Britain and Russia to strengthen the Sixth Coalition against Napoleon. Britain agreed to pay for a German legion of 10,000 troops in Russian service.

== See also ==
- List of treaties

== Sources ==
- Clare, Israel Smith. Library of Universal History: Containing a Record of the Human Race from the Earliest Historical Period to the Present Time Embracing a General Survey of the Progress of Mankind in National and Social Life, Civil Government, Religion, Literature, Science and Art. R. S. Peale, J. A. Hill, 1897 (Original from the New York Public Library).
