= Strastnaya Sedmitsa (Grechaninov) =

Strastnaya sed'mitsa (Страстна́я седми́ца; The Passion Week) Op.58 is a 1911 Church Slavonic choral work by Alexander Grechaninov. The work shows the influence of Wagner rather than Russian nationalist musical trends.

== Recordings ==
- Grechaninov: Strastnaya sedmitsa Russian State Symphonic Cappella Valéry Polyansky 1999
- Grechaninov: Passion Week, Op. 58 Phoenix Bach Choir & Kansas City Chorale, Charles Bruffy 2007
