= Charles H. Liebermann =

American physician

Charles H. Liebermann (September 15, 1813 – March 27, 1886) was a Russian-American physician and one of the co-founders of the Georgetown University School of Medicine.

== Biography ==
Liebermann was born in Riga, then part of the Russian Empire. His father, a military surgeon, died when Liebermann was young, but his uncle ensured that he received a quality education. He studied medicine at the University of Dorpat in Russia, but he was arrested for his involvement in the Polish independence movement. He escaped from prison in Siberia and continued the study of medicine at the University of Berlin. He became an assistant to the surgeon Johann Friedrich Dieffenbach and also studied under Karl Ferdinand von Graefe.

Liebermann returned to Czarist Russia. He was briefly imprisoned again, then banished from the country. After spending brief periods in Holland and England, Liebermann came to the United States. He arrived in Washington, D.C. and, despite struggles with the English language, was able to set up a profitable medical practice. However, he was disappointed with how the level of medical care in Washington compared to that of Europe. He became one of four physicians who received approval to found the medical school at Georgetown College.

He became the first Jewish professor at Georgetown University when he was appointed Professor of Principles and Practice of Surgery in 1849.

While Liebermann did not have the most well-known medical career of the four medical school founders, he was responsible for most of the initial planning that went into the establishment of the school. He was president of the Medical Society of the District of Columbia and he was one of the physicians who cared for Abraham Lincoln after the president was shot.

Liebermann and his wife had two children. He retired in 1872 and died in 1886.
