= Alexander Gretchaninov =

Russian Romantic composer (1864–1956)

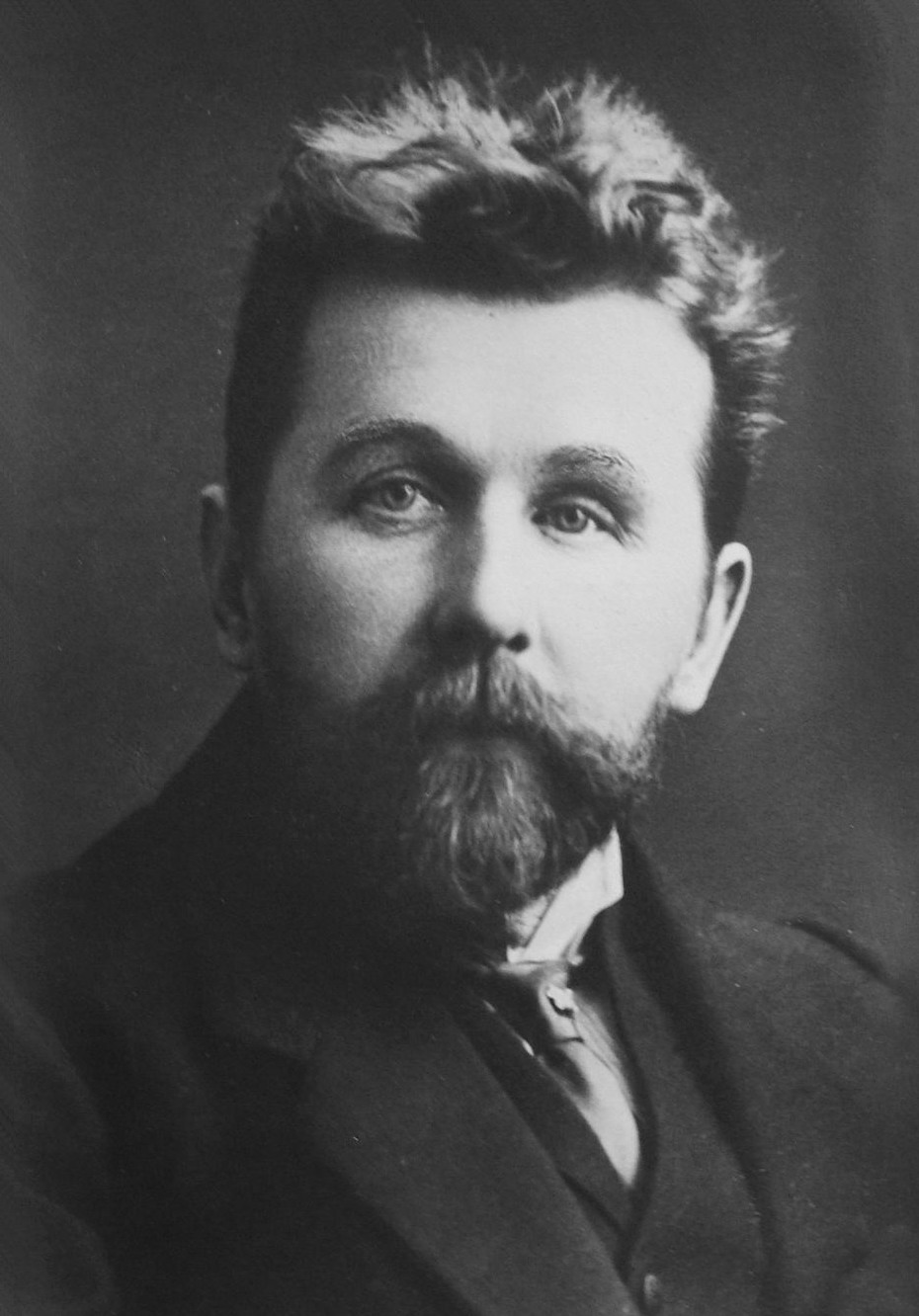
Postcard, 1905-1910 of Alexander Gretchaninov

Alexander Tikhonovich Gretchaninov (Russian: Алекса́ндр Ти́хонович Гречани́нов, IPA: [ɐlʲɪˈksandr ɡrʲɪtɕɐˈnʲinəf]; 25 October [O.S. 13 October] 1864 – 3 January 1956) was a Russian Romantic composer.

== Life ==
Gretchaninov started his musical studies rather late, because his father, a businessman, had expected the boy to take over the family firm. Gretchaninov himself related that he did not see a piano until he was 14 and began his studies at the Moscow Conservatory in 1881 against his father's wishes and without his knowledge. His main teachers there were Sergei Taneyev and Anton Arensky. In the late 1880s, after a quarrel with Arensky, he moved to St. Petersburg where he studied composition and orchestration with Nikolai Rimsky-Korsakov until 1893. Rimsky-Korsakov immediately recognized Gretchaninov's extraordinary musical imagination and talent and gave him much extra time as well as considerable financial help. This allowed the young man, whose parents were not supporting him, to survive. Out of this came an important friendship, which only ended in 1908 with Rimsky's death. As such, it is not surprising that Rimsky's influence can be heard in Gretchaninov's early works, such as his String Quartet No. 1, a prize-winning composition.

Around 1896, Gretchaninov returned to Moscow and was involved with writing for the theatre, the opera and the Russian Orthodox Church. His works, especially those for voice, achieved considerable success within Russia, while his instrumental works enjoyed even wider acclaim. By 1910, he was considered a composer of such distinction that the Tsar awarded him an annual pension.

Though Gretchaninov remained in Russia for several years after the Revolution, he ultimately chose to emigrate, first to France in 1925, and then, at the age of 75, to the United States in 1939. He remained in the U.S. the rest of his life and eventually became an American citizen. He died in New York at the age of 91 and is buried outside the church at Rova Farms, a Russian enclave in Jackson Township, Ocean County, New Jersey.

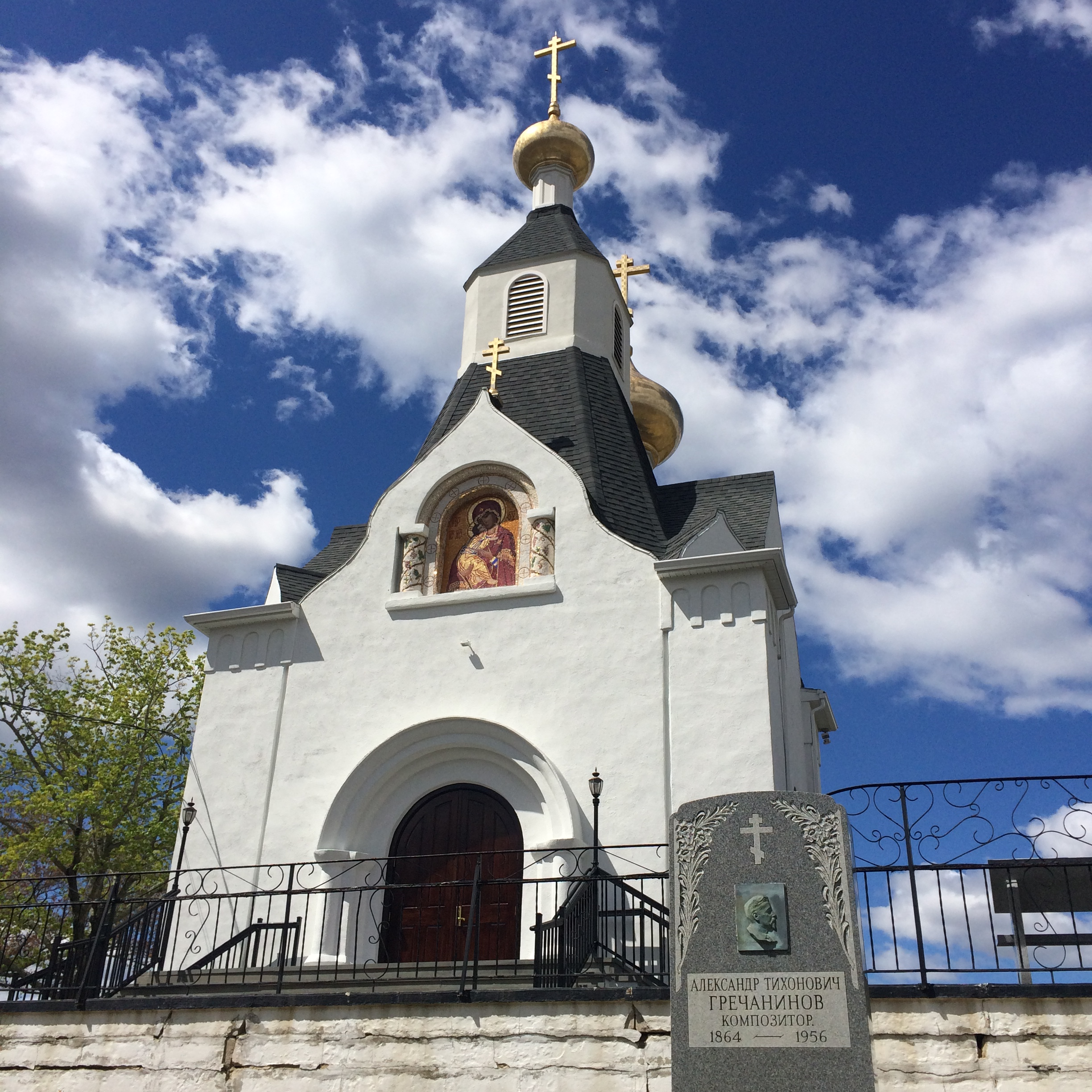
Grave of Alexander Gretchaninov

== Music ==
Gretchaninov wrote five symphonies, the first premiered by Rimsky-Korsakov; four string quartets, the first two of which won important prizes, two piano trios, sonatas for violin, cello, clarinet, piano and balalaika, several operas, song cycle Les Fleurs du Mal, op. 48 (setting lyrics by Baudelaire) and much other music.

Like Vladimir Rebikov's, his position in the history of Russian music was mainly transitional, his earlier music belonging firmly in that earlier Romantic tradition while his later work is influenced by some of the streams that also affected Igor Stravinsky and Sergei Prokofiev.

Sketches for an unfinished sixth symphony from the 1940s exist.

He also composed a number of small scale piano pieces.

Most of Gretchaninov's manuscripts reside in the Music Division of New York Public Library for the Performing Arts.

== Selected works ==
=== Orchestral ===
==== Symphonies ====
- Symphony No. 1 in B minor, Op. 6 (1894); premiered by Nikolai Rimsky-Korsakov in Saint Petersburg on 26 January 1895
- Symphony No. 2 in A major, Pastoral, Op. 27 (1908); premiered by Gretchaninov in 1909 in Kiev
- Symphony No. 3 in E major, Op. 100 (1923); premiered by Gretchaninov in 1923(4?) in Moscow
- Symphony No. 4 in C major, Op. 102 (1927); premiered by John Barbirolli & the New York Philharmonic Orchestra on 9 April 1942
- Symphony No. 5 in G minor, Op. 153 (1936); premiered by Leopold Stokowski and the Philadelphia Orchestra on 5 April 1939
- Symphony No. 6 (sketches, c. 1940s)

==== Concerti ====
- Cello Concerto, Op. 8 (1895)
- In modo antico, Op. 81, for violin & orchestra (1918)
- Violin Concerto, Op. 132 (1932)
- Concerto for flute, harp and strings, Op. 159 (1938)

==== Other orchestral ====
- Concert Overture in D minor (1892)
- Elegy in Memory of Tchaikovsky (1893)
- Incidental Music to the play Tsar Feodor of Tolstoy (1898)
- Incidental Music to the play The Death of Ivan the Terrible of Tolstoy (1899)
- Incidental Music to the play Dreams of Danchenko (1899)
- Funeral March (1905)
- Rhapsody on Russian Themes, Op. 147 (1940)
- Poème élégiaque, Op. 175 (1944 or 1945)
- A Grand Festival Overture, Op. 178 (1946)
- Poème lyrique, Op. 185 (1947–48)

=== Opera ===
- Dobrynya Nikitich, Op. 22 (1895-1901) after the story of the bogatyr Dobrynya Nikitich.
- Soeur Béatrice, Op. 50 (1908–10)
- The Dream of the Christmas Tree Kinderoper, Op. 55 (1911)
- Der Kater, der Hahn und der Fuchs, Kinderoper, Op. 103 (1924)
- The Wedding, Op. 180 (1946)

=== Secular songs and choral music ===
- 4 Mélodies, for medium voice and piano, Op. 20 (1899)
- Snowflakes (Снежинки, Snezhiniki) – Song Cycle for Woman's Voice or Choir and Orchestra or Piano, Op. 47 (1910)
- Les Fleurs du mal – 5 Songs after Baudelaire, Op. 48 (1909)
- The Bee: 6 Children's Songs, Op. 66 (1914)
- Under the Waxing Moon, 4 Songs from a Child's World after Poetry by Rabindranath Tagore, Op. 95 (1925)
- Sonetti romani, for voice and piano (Russian text by Vyacheslav Ivanov), Op. 160 (1939)
  - Piazza di Spagna, Op. 160, No. 1
  - Fontana della Tartaruga, Op. 160, No. 2
  - Triton, Op. 160, No. 3
  - Il tramontare del sole al Pincio, Op. 160, No. 4
  - Fontana di Trevi, Op. 160, No. 5
- Vers la victoire, symphonic poem (1943)

=== Liturgical vocal/choral ===
- Liturgie Johannes Chrysostomos No. 1, Op. 13 (1897)
- Liturgy of Christmas Eve, Op. 19, for double mixed choir (1898)
- Liturgie Johannes Chrysostomos No. 2, Op. 29 (1902)
- Holy Week (Страстная седмица), Op. 58 (1911)
- All-Night Vigil (Всенощное бдение), Op. 59 (1912)
- Kvalite Boga, Op. 65 (1915)
- Liturgia Domestica (Liturgie Johannes Chrysostomos No. 3), Op. 79 (1917)
- Missa Oecumenica, Op. 142 (1936)
- Missa Festiva, Op. 154 (1937)
- Missa Sancti Spiritus, Op. 169 (1940)
- Missa Et in Terra Pax, Op. 166 (1942)
- Liturgie Johannes Chrysostomos No. 4, Op. 177 (1943)

=== Chamber music ===
- String Quartet No. 1 in G major, Op. 2 (1894)
- 2 Pieces for Violin and Piano, Op. 14 (1897)
- Piano Trio No. 1 in C minor, Op. 38 (1906)
- String Quartet No. 2 in D minor, Op. 70 (1913)
- String Quartet No. 3 in C minor, Op. 75 (1915)
- Violin Sonata No. 1 in D major, Op. 87 (1919)
- Cello Sonata in E minor, Op. 113 (1927)
- String Quartet No. 4 in F major, Op. 124 (1929)
- Piano Trio No. 2 in G major, Op. 128 (1931)
- Violin Sonata No. 2 in C minor, Op. 137 (1933)
- Sonata for Clarinet or Viola & Piano (Clarinet Sonata No. 1), Op. 161 (1935–40)
- Clarinet Sonata No. 2, Op. 172(a) (1943)

=== Piano music ===
- 5 Pastelles: Plainte, Méditation, Chant d'automne, Orage, Nocturne, Op. 3 (1894)
- 2 Pieces: Poème, Cortège, Op. 18
- 2 Pieces: Impromptu, Prélude, Op. 37
- 4 Mazurkas, Op. 53 (1911)
- Pastelle No. 2, 8 pieces for piano, Op. 61 (1913)
- 3 Moments lyriques (Prélude, Berceuse, Mazurka), Op. 78 (pub. 1950)
- Livre d'enfants, 15 pieces for piano, Op. 98 (1923)
- On the Green Meadow, Op. 99 (1924)
- 2 Piano Sonatinas, Op. 110 (1927)
- The Grandfather's Book, Op. 119
- Glass Beads, Op. 123 (1929)
- Piano Sonata No. 1 in G minor, Op. 129 (1931)
- Piano Sonata No. 2 in G major, Op. 174 (1944)
- Petite Suite for Piano, Op. 176 (1944)

== See also ==
- Blazhen Muzh
