= Aziory =

Aziory (Belarusian: Азёры) is the name of several localities in Belarus. The word literally means "lakes".

- Aziory, Grodno District, an agrotown in Grodno Region
- Aziory, Dubrowna District, a village in Vitebsk Region
- Aziory, Babruysk District, a village in Mogilev Region
- Aziory, Kruhlaye District, a village in Mogilev Region
- Aziory (preserve), a nature preserve in Grodno Region
