= Alexander Ozersky =

Russian geologist (1813–1880)

Alexander Dmitrievich Ozersky (Russian: Александр Дмитриевич Озерский 9 September 1813 – 19 September 1880) was a Russian military geologist and specialist on mining who also served as a governor of Tomsk.

Ozersky was born in Chernihiv in a noble family. His father Dmitry was a councillor and his mother Varvara was a nephew of Decembrist Mikhail Alexandrovich Nazimov. graduated from the mining cadet corps school in St Petersburg in 1831 and then began to teach there. In 1857 he was promoted to major general and headed mining, particularly of gold, in the Altai region. He also began to examine vertical tectonic movements in the crust. He translated the work Sir Roderick Murchison and colleagues on the geology of the Urals.

Ozersky documented the Silurian strata of the Baltic region in 1843. He suggested that oil deposits had an organic origin and thought they were derived from molluscs. He believed that uplift of strata was caused by magma being injected underneath a sedimentary shell and noticed patterns in the distribution of ores in Transbaikalia, noting that they were associated with intrusive igneous strata. Ozersky termed this wave like crumpling as epeirogenic which was later termed as oscillatory or wave oscillations of the crust by other authors.

Ozersky was also made governor of the Tomsk province and was involved in the 1861 reform involving the liberation of registered peasants taking up a conservative position. He was involved in the establishment of a theological seminary in 1858 and a women's gymnasium in 1863. He returned to St. Petersburg in 1864 and served in the Imperial Cabinet and in the Mining Scientific Committee.
