= Stepan Degtyarev =

Russian composer (1766–1813)

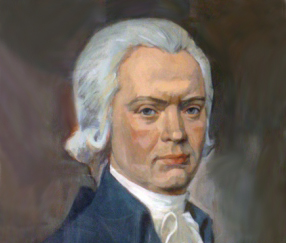
Stepan Degtyarev

Stepan Anikiyevich Degtyarev (or Degtyatryov; Russian: Степан Аникиевич Дегтярёв; 1766 – 5 May 1813) was a Russian composer. Born into a serf family, he stood out among other serf composers. He was most famous for his nationalistic Russian choral music.

His oratorio Minin and Pozharsky - or the Liberation of Moscow (1811) concerned the 1612 liberation of Moscow from Polish occupation during the Time of Troubles interregnum by the Second Zemschina Army led by Kuzma Minin-Sukhoruk, a fishmonger, and Prince Dmitry Pozharsky.

== Works, editions and recordings ==
Degtyarev's works:

- Oratorio Minin and Pozharsky - or the Liberation of Moscow «Минин и Пожарский, или освобождение Москвы» 1811

His recordings include:

- Minin and Pozharsky - or the Liberation of Moscow, Conductor Sergei Skripka, The Moscow Philharmonic Orchestra, Melodiya 1990 (2CD)

== Sources ==
- "Дегтярев, Степан Аникиевич" . Brockhaus and Efron Encyclopedic Dictionary (in Russian). 1906.
- Ritzarev, Marina (5 July 2017). Eighteenth-Century Russian Music. Routledge. ISBN 978-1-351-56860-9.
