= Viktor Askochensky =

Russian writer, journalist and historian

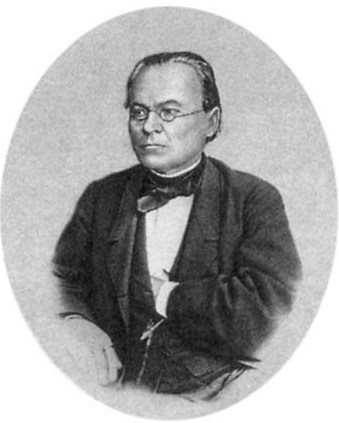
- Born: Viktor Ipatyevich Askochensky; Виктор Ипатьевич Аскоченский; 13 October 1813; Voronezh, Russian Empire
- Died: 30 May 1879 (aged 65); Saint Petersburg, Russian Empire
- Occupations: writer, historian

Viktor Ipatyevich Askochensky (Russian: Виктор Ипатьевич Аскоченский, 13 October 1813—30 May 1879) was a Russian writer, journalist and historian.

Born in Voronezh into a clergyman's family and a Kiev Theological Academy's alumnus, Askochensky the historian is best remembered for his work on the history of the Orthodoxy in Ukraine. Much discussed was his novel The Asmodeus of Our Times (Асмодей нашего времени, 1858), a passionate paean to Orthodoxy. In 1858 Askochensky launched the magazine Domashnyaya Beseda (Home Soliloquy) which he edited for twenty years until 1877 when he became hospitalized for mental illness. He spent the rest of his days in the Peter and Paul Hospital in Saint Petersburg, where he died on 30 May 1879. He is interred in the Coastal Monastery of Saint Sergius.

Askochensky's writings divided critical opinion. His detractors included Alexander Herzen, Apollon Grigoryev and Fyodor Dostoyevsky, among his supporters were Nikolai Leskov, Lev Tolstoy and Sergei Nilus.
