= Acolyte =

Ministry in the Christian Church

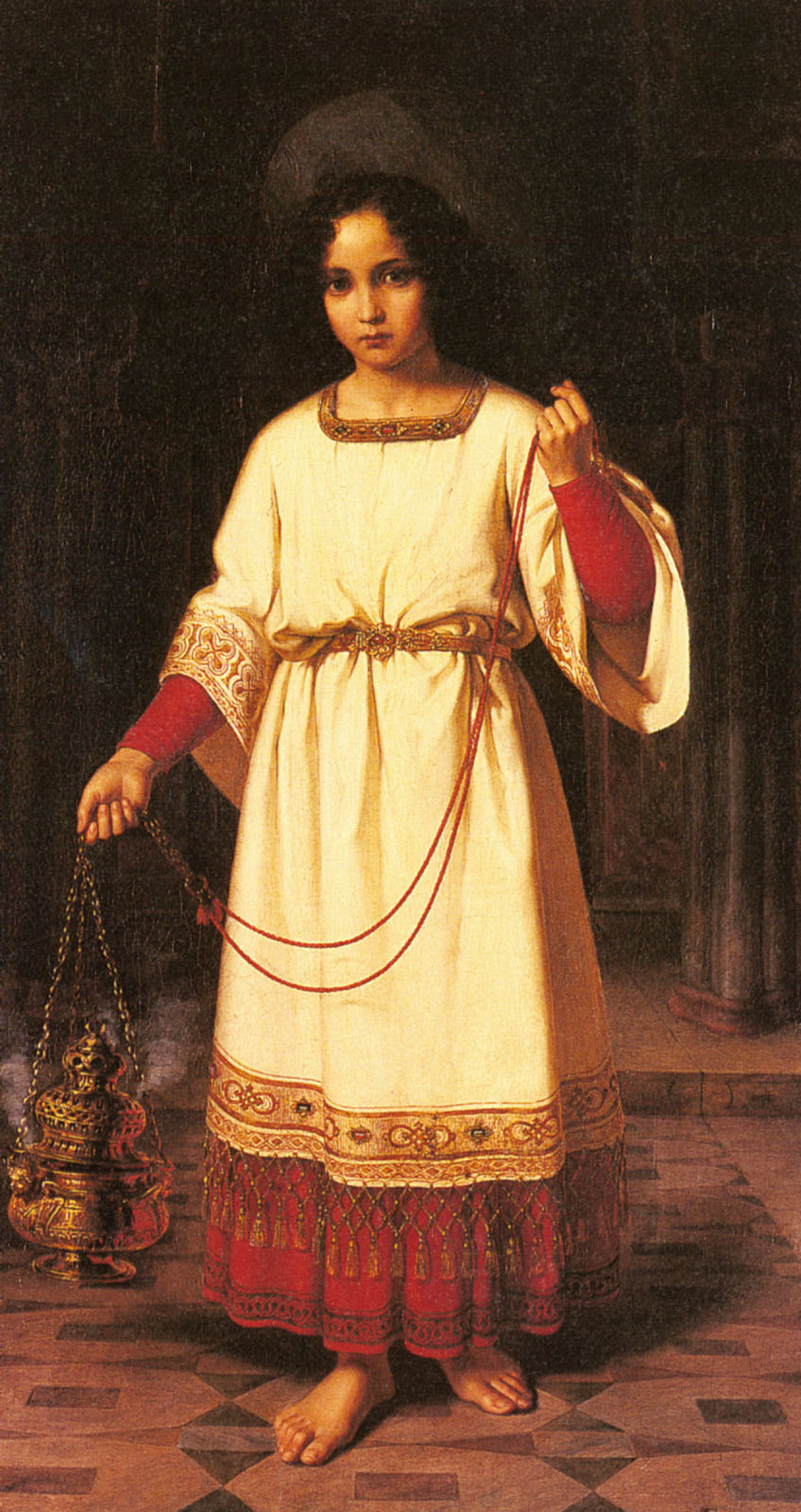
The Acolyte by Abraham Solomon, 1842

An acolyte is an assistant or follower assisting the celebrant in a religious service or procession. In many Christian denominations, an acolyte is anyone performing ceremonial duties such as lighting altar candles. In others, the term is used for one who has been inducted into a particular liturgical ministry, even when not performing those duties.

== Etymology ==
The word acolyte is derived from the Greek word ἀκόλουθος (akolouthos), meaning an attendant, via Late Latin acolythus.

== Eastern Christianity ==
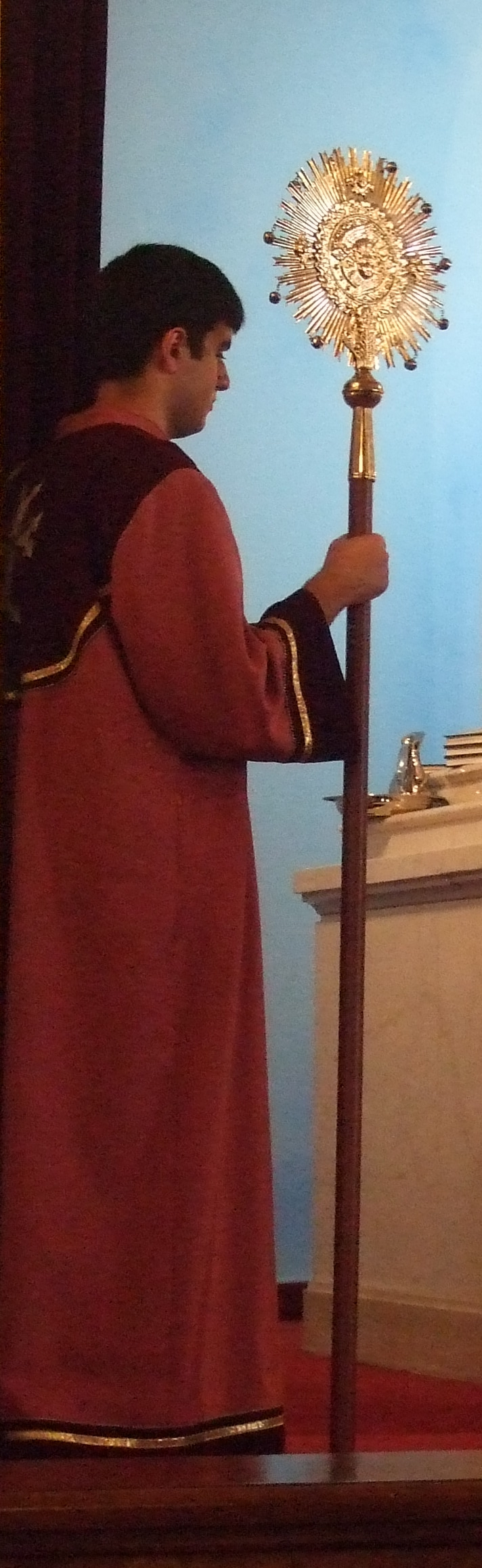
An Armenian acolyte holding a ripida (a liturgical fan)

In the Eastern Orthodox, Eastern Lutheran and Byzantine Rite Eastern Catholic Churches, the nearest equivalent of acolyte is the altar server. At one time there was a rank of minor clergy called the taper-bearer (κηροφόρος) responsible for bearing lights during processions and liturgical entrances. However, this rank has long ago been subsumed by that of the reader and the service for the tonsure of a reader begins with the setting-aside of a taper-bearer.

The functions of an acolyte or taper-bearer are therefore carried out by readers, subdeacons, or by non-tonsured men or boys who are sometimes called "acolytes" informally. Also, the term "altar-boys" is often used to refer to young altar servers. Subdeacons wear their normal vestments consisting of the sticharion and crossed orarion; readers and servers traditionally wear the sticharion alone.

In recent times, however, in many of the North American Greek Orthodox Churches, for the sake of uniformity, readers have been permitted to wear the orarion (the bishop presents the reader, who is to serve on the altar, with the orarion). Readers do not cross the orarion while wearing it, the uncrossed orarion being intended to slightly distinguish a reader from a subdeacon. In some churches wear both the sticharion and orarion, while others use the orarion alone. In other churches, acolytes are asked to be neatly dressed, and to fast completely each Sunday until Holy Communion is completed.

In the Russian tradition, readers wear only the sticharion, and do not wear the orarion unless they have been specially blessed to by their bishop. (This might be done if a reader must occasionally serve in the role of a subdeacon, or for some other reason the bishop believes is fitting.) If a server has not been tonsured, he must remove the sticharion before he can receive Holy Communion.

== Western Christianity ==
=== Catholic Church ===
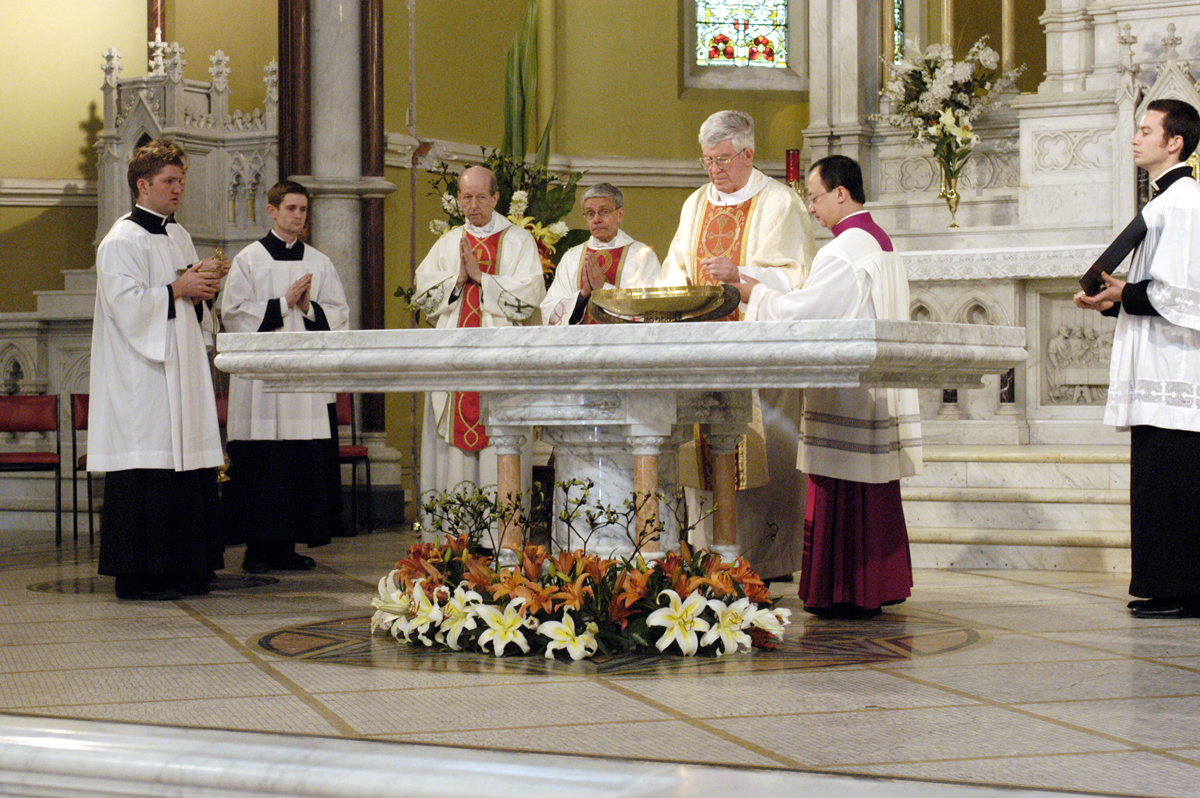
Acolytes assisting at the dedication of an altar

Until 1972, the highest of the four minor orders in the Latin Church was that of acolyte. By his motu proprio Ministeria quaedam of 15 August 1972, Pope Paul VI replaced the term "minor orders" by that of "ministries" and the term "ordination" by "institution". He kept throughout the Latin Church two now-titled instituted ministries, those of reader and acolyte. A prescribed interval, as decided by the Holy See and the national episcopal conference, is to be observed between receiving the two. Candidates for diaconate and for priesthood must receive both ministries and exercise them for some time before receiving holy orders. The two instituted ministries are not reserved solely for candidates for holy orders. Ministries are conferred by the ordinary: either a bishop or the head of a similar territory or, in the case of clerical religious institutes, a major superior. Institutions of acolytes not preparing for holy orders are in fact sometimes carried out.

The motu proprio assigned to the instituted acolyte the functions previously reserved for the subdeacon, and declared national episcopal conferences free to use the term "subdeacon" in place of that of "acolyte". The functions of the instituted acolyte are specified in the motu proprio, and have been indicated also in the General Instruction of the Roman Missal, no. 98, which under the heading, "The Ministry of the Instituted Acolyte and Lector", says: "The acolyte is instituted to serve at the altar and to assist the priest and deacon. In particular, it is his responsibility to prepare the altar and the sacred vessels and, if it is necessary, as an extraordinary minister, to distribute the Eucharist to the faithful. In the ministry of the altar, the acolyte has his own functions (cf. nos. 187–193), which he must perform personally."

The General Instruction of the Roman Missal adds: "In the absence of an instituted acolyte, lay ministers may be deputed to serve at the altar and assist the priest and the deacon; they may carry the cross, the candles, the thurible, the bread, the wine, and the water, and they may also be deputed to distribute Holy Communion as extraordinary ministers." However, some functions, in particular that of cleansing the Eucharistic vessels, are reserved for an instituted acolyte and are not entrusted to those deputed to assist in that way.

As in other churches, in the Latin Church the term "acolyte" is also used of altar servers on whom no ordination or institution has been conferred. Pope Benedict XVI spoke of Saint Tarcisius as "presumably an acolyte, that is, an altar server".

Pope Francis changed canon law in January 2021 to allow female installed acolytes. Before his motu proprio Spiritus Domini, only men could be installed acolytes.

While the approved English translations of the liturgical books of the Catholic Church's Roman Rite use the term "instituted" (such as "instituted acolytes" and "instituted lectors") some translations refer to them as "installed". For example, the translation on the Vatican's website of the 2019 Motu Proprio Aperuit illis – Instituting the Sunday of the Word of God has "Bishops could celebrate the Rite of Installation of Lectors or a similar commissioning of readers …".

=== Evangelical-Lutheran Churches ===
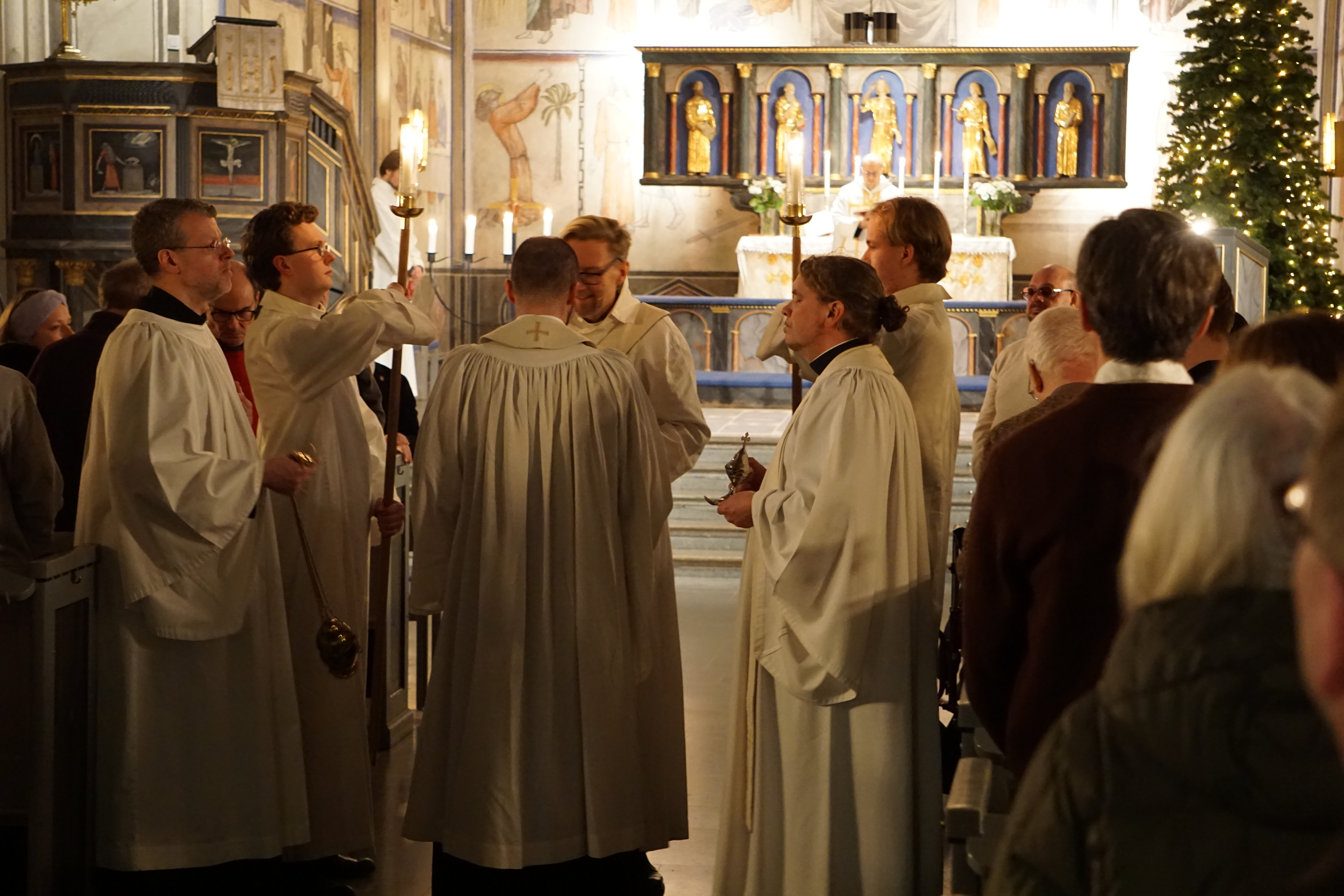
The priest and acolytes during the Gospel reading at Saint Matthew's Evangelical-Lutheran Church at Midnight Mass on Christmas Eve

In the Lutheran Churches, acolytes have various responsibilities, such as ringing the church bells and lighting the candles in the chancel. The various acolytes in the Lutheran Churches have different roles:

- Crucifer
- Thurifer
- Torchbearer
- Biblebearer
- Bannerbearer

Certain acolytes are assigned the role of crucifer or thurifer, who carry the processional cross and thurible respectively. The torchbearer stands to the side of the crucifer to carry candles, during the procession and recession. The bannerbearer typically carries a gonfalon in processions and recessions. The Bible bearer is tasked with placing "the Bible on the altar or missal stand until the Gospel procession."

Acolytes typically wear albs and the cincture used may reflect the colour of the liturgical season in the Christian calendar.

The role of the acolyte is considered important in Lutheranism as those who serve in these roles, typically youth, often develop an interest in holy orders.

=== Anglican Churches ===
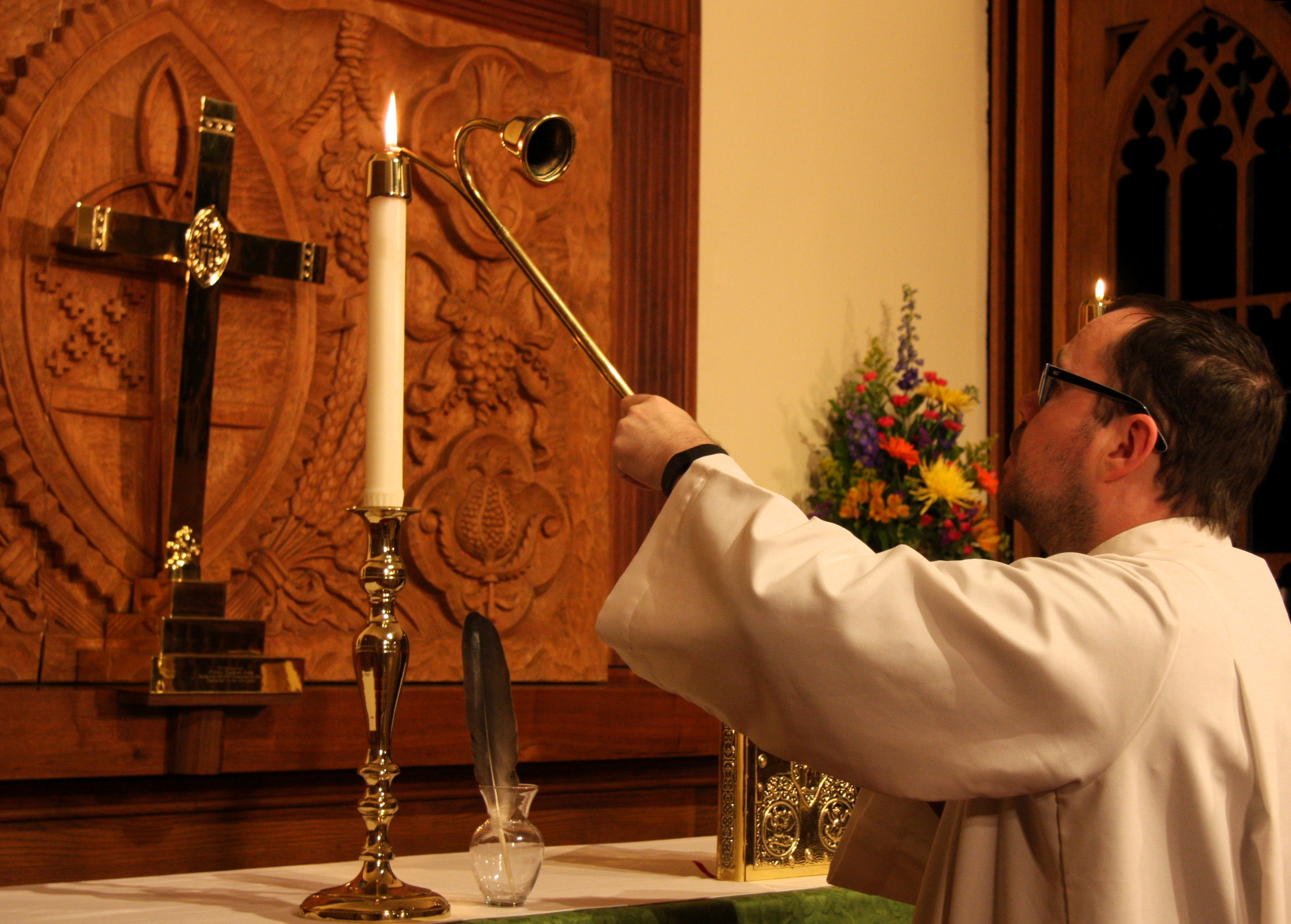
An Episcopal acolyte lighting an altar candle

The order of acolyte was not initially retained with Anglicanism during the English Reformation therefore there is no definition of their role in the Book of Common Prayer 1662. The use of acolytes (like many Anglican practices) is very much dependent on local practice, some parishes may refer to altar servers as acolytes, whereas other parishes may have them as a distinctive and formal ministry. Then in Low or Evangelical Parishes the use of Acolytes or altar servers may not exist at all. Where acolytes are used, opinions on gender and age vary.

An acolyte can assist in worship by carrying a processional cross, lighting candles, holding the Gospel book, holding candles or "torches", assisting a deacon or priest prepare and clean the altar, swinging a censer or thurible (also being named the thurifer) or carrying the incense boat, handing the offering plates to ushers, and many other tasks as seen fit by the priest or acolyte warden.

=== Methodist Churches ===
In the Methodist tradition, acolytes may participate in the worship service by carrying a processional cross or crucifix (these acolytes are called crucifers), lighting and extinguishing the altar candles, and ringing the church bell to call the congregation to worship. In these traditions, the lighting of the altar candles in the worship service is a symbol of Jesus' coming into the presence of the worshiping community. Before lighting the candles the acolyte may bow at the altar out of respect. Before the extinguishing of the last altar candles, the acolytes relight their "candle lighter" and then process out into the narthex. This symbolizes that Jesus Christ is for all people everywhere. It also symbolizes the light of Jesus Christ going out into the world where believers are called to serve. Acolytes in these traditions wear robes called albs, sometimes with a cincture; alternatively Methodist acolytes in other congregations wear the traditional cassock and cotta.

== Gallery ==
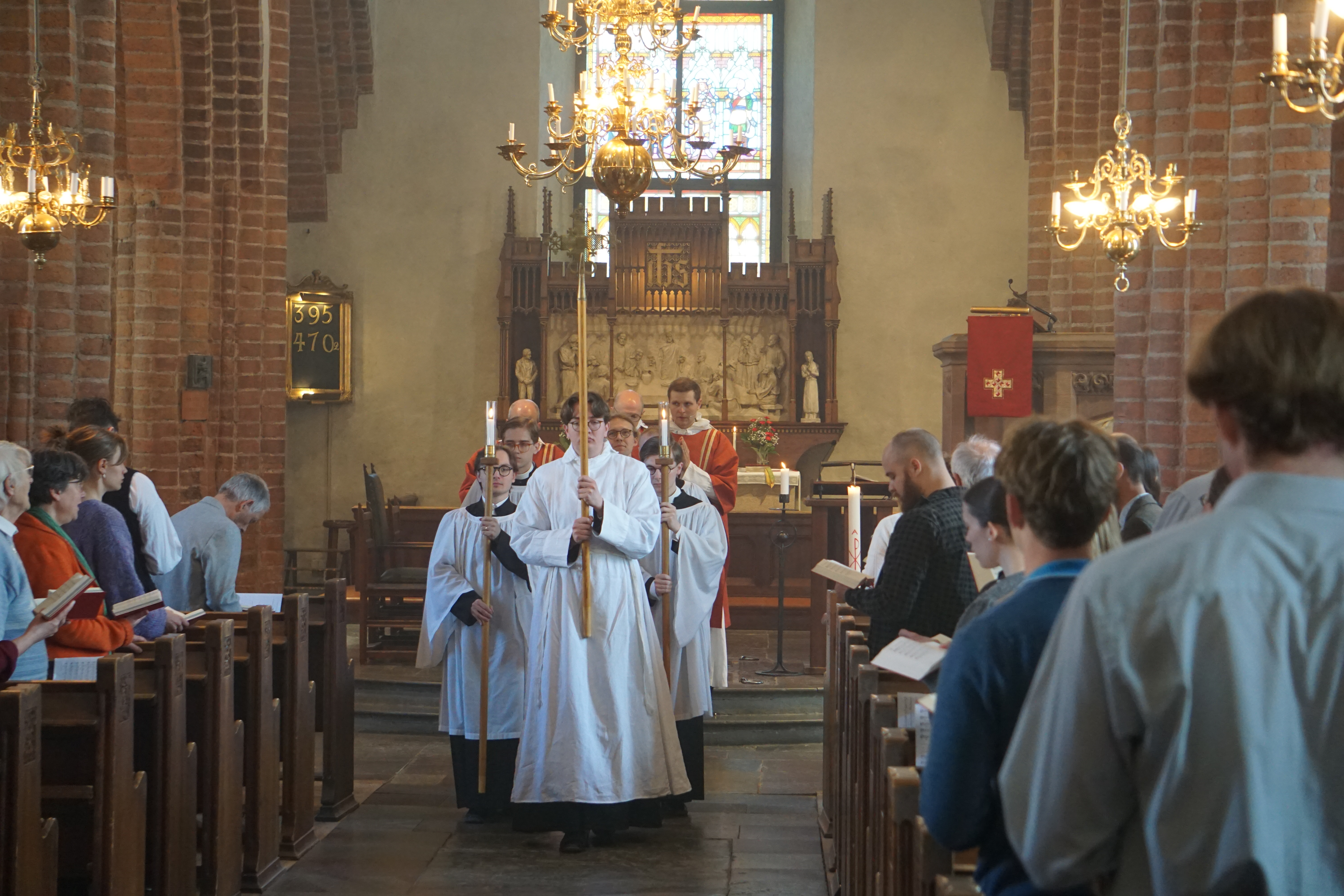
Evangelical-Lutheran acolytes (with the crossbearer in the center) in the recessional during High Mass at Holy Trinity Church in Uppsala on the Feast Day of the Apostles Philip and James the Less

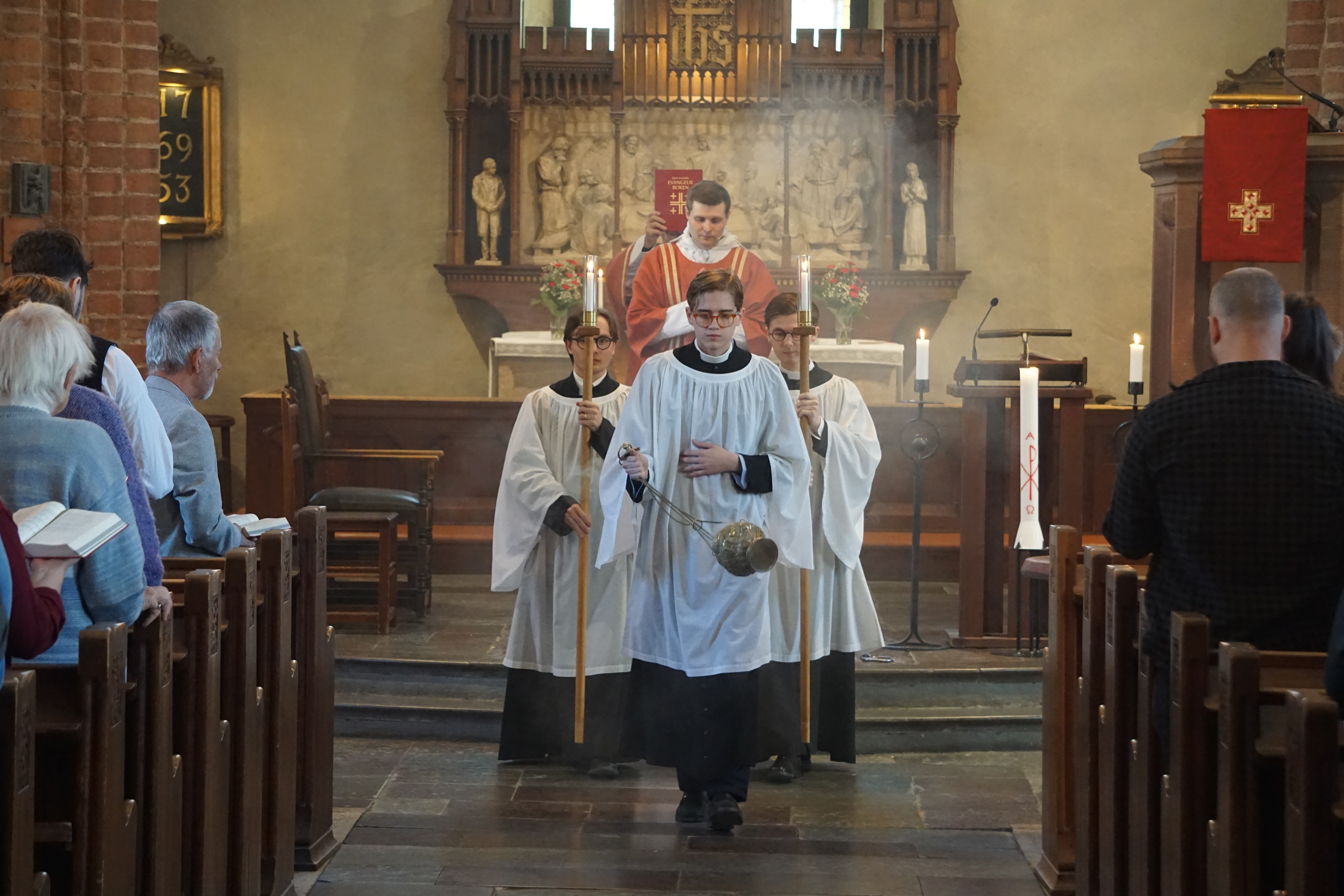
Evangelical-Lutheran acolytes (with the thurifer and torchbearers in the center) prepare for the Gospel Reading during High Mass at Holy Trinity Church in Uppsala on the Feast Day of the Apostles Philip and James the Less

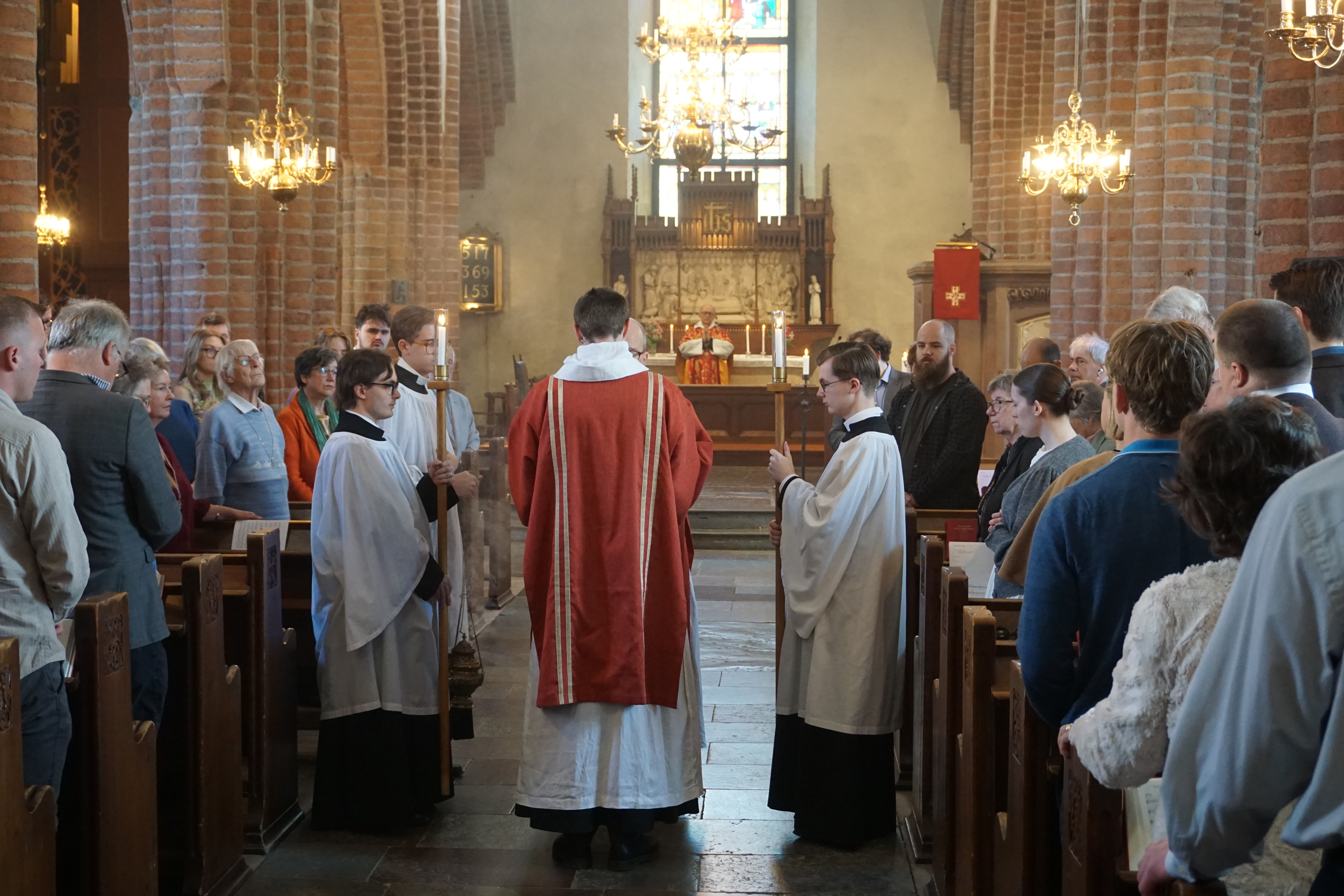
Evangelical-Lutheran torchbearers during the Gospel Reading during High Mass at Holy Trinity Church in Uppsala on the Feast Day of the Apostles Philip and James the Less

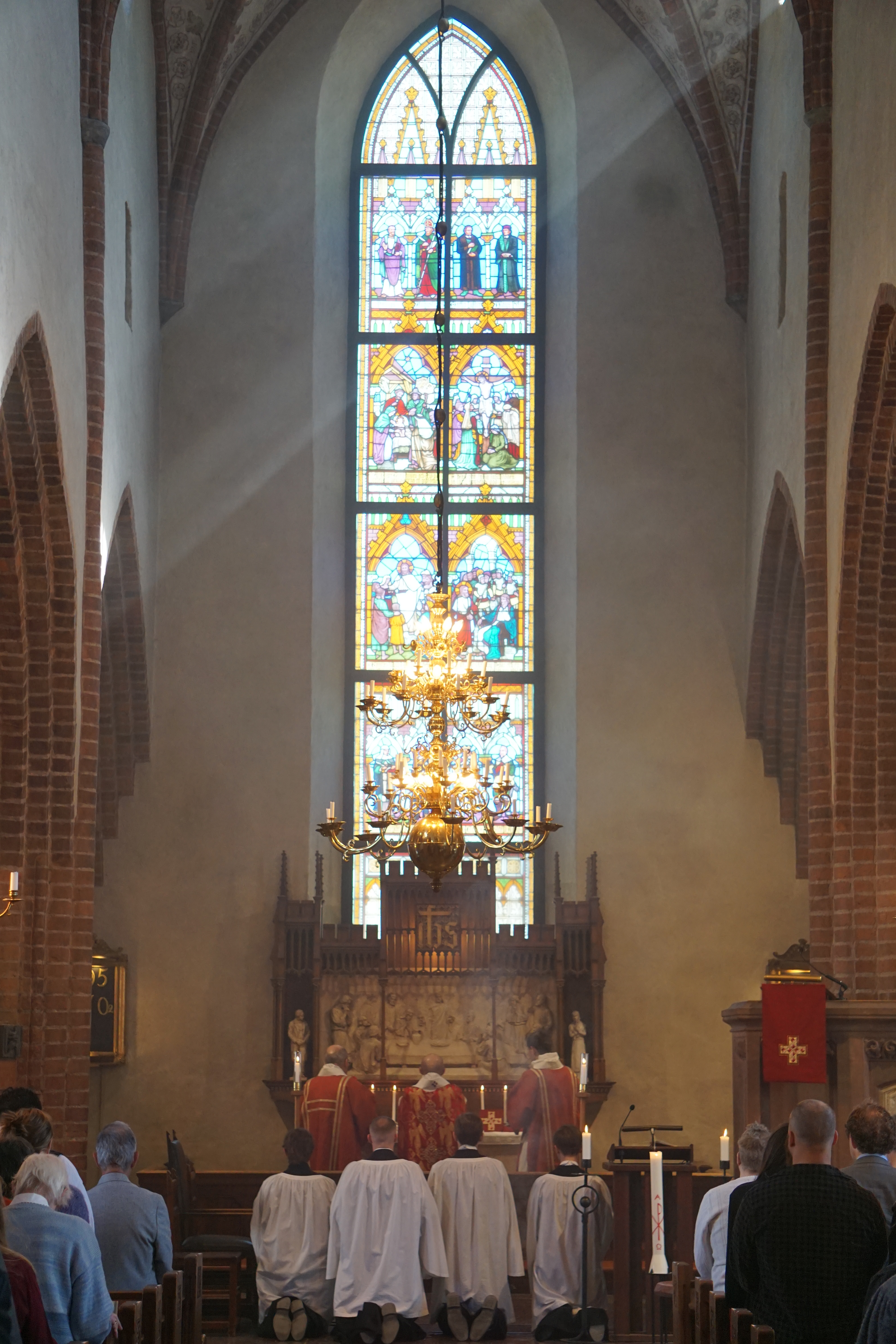
Evangelical-Lutheran acolytes kneel during High Mass at Holy Trinity Church in Uppsala on the Feast Day of the Apostles Philip and James the Less

Evangelical-Lutheran acolytes in the recession at the close of the offering of the Mass at Vadstena Abbey Church in Sweden

== See also ==
- Shganda in Mandaeism
