= Crucifer =

Cross-bearer in church's processions

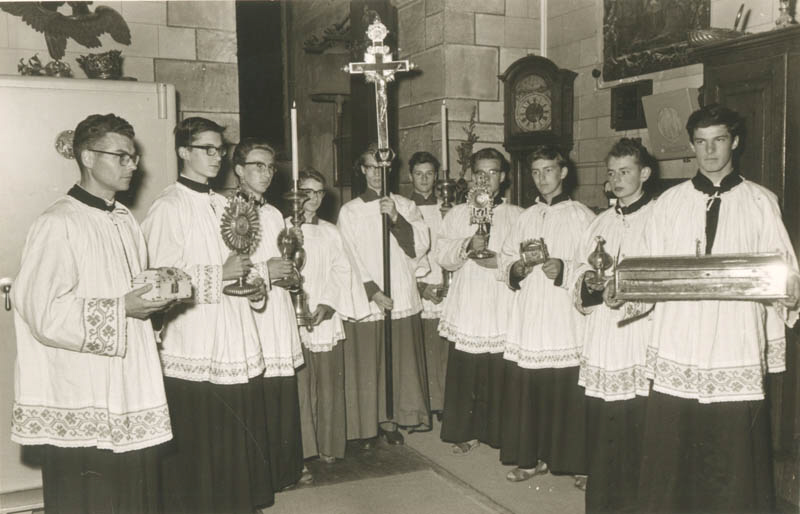
A crucifer, in the center, carrying a cross

A crucifer, or cross-bearer, is a person appointed in some Christian churches (particularly the Catholic Church, Lutheran churches, Anglican Communion, and Methodist churches) to carry the church's processional cross, a cross or crucifix with a long staff, during processions at the beginnings and ends of services. In these Christian denominations, crucifer is a role assigned to a certain acolyte or altar server.

== Etymology ==
The term "crucifer" comes from the Latin crux (cross) and ferre (to bear, carry). It thus literally means "cross-bearer". Use of the term "crucifer" is most common in the Lutheran and Anglican churches, as well as in certain Catholic congregations. In the Catholic Church, the usual term is "cross-bearer", which is employed in certain Lutheran congregations as well.

== Role by Christian denomination ==
=== Catholic Church ===
In the Latin Catholic Church the function of the crucifer/cross-bearer was generally carried out by a subdeacon until Pope Paul VI decreed in his motu proprio Ministeria quaedam of 15 August 1972 that "the major order of subdiaconate no longer exists in the Latin Church". In line with that document, the functions previously assigned to the subdeacon are now entrusted to the acolyte and the reader.

A seventeenth-century Council of Milan stated that a crucifer should, when possible, be a cleric and that, if a lay person be selected, that "the most worthy of the laity should be selected for the office." For more solemn processions, the cleric should be vested in amice, alb, and tunic. On less solemn occasions he may just be vested in surplice. During the procession the staff is held with both hands such that the cross is well above the head. The cross-bearer leads the procession except when there is a thurifer and is accompanied by two servers on the more solemn occasions.

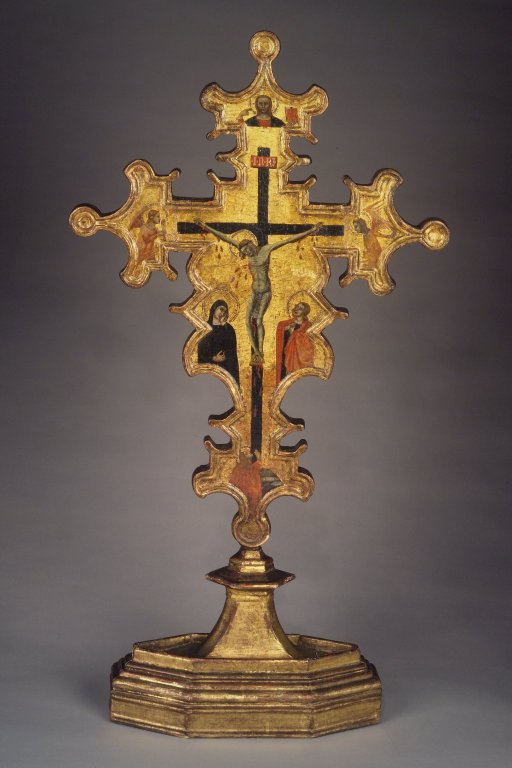
Brooklyn Museum – Double-Sided Processional Cross – Master of Monte del Lago

=== Lutheran churches ===
In the Lutheran churches, the crucifer is an acolyte who carries the processional cross. Torchbearers stand to the side of the crucifer. During the procession and the recession, the crucifer "holds the cross in an elevated and dignified manner".

=== Anglican Communion ===
In the Anglican Communion, the crucifer is an acolyte who carries the processional cross.

== See also ==
- Acolyte
- Altar cross
- Altar server
- Processional Cross
- Thurifer
