= Altar server =

Assistant to a member of the clergy

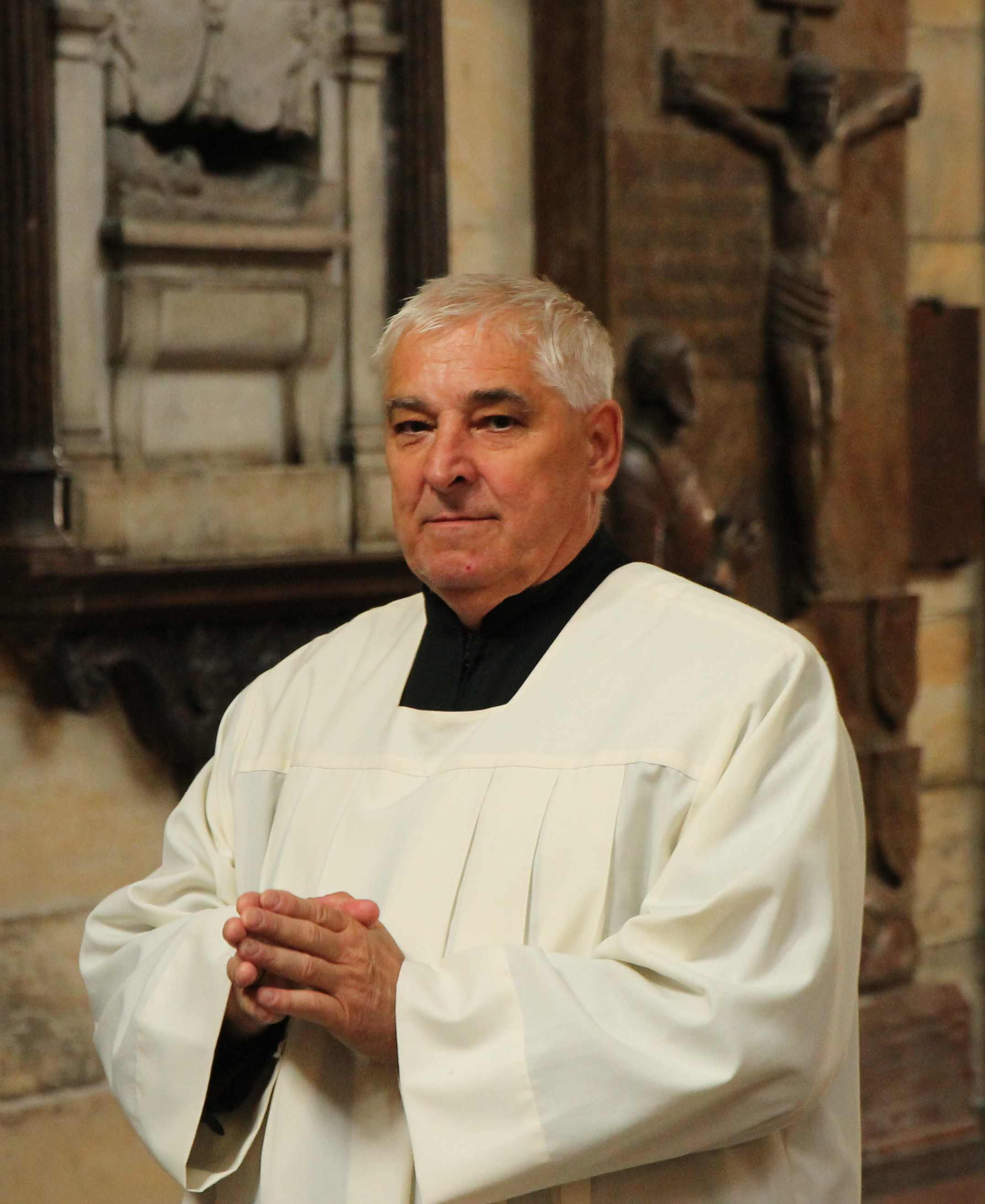
A Czech altar server

An altar server is a lay assistant to a member of the clergy during a Christian liturgy. An altar server attends to supporting tasks at the altar such as fetching and carrying, ringing the altar bell, helping bring up the gifts (the bread and wine to become the body and blood of Jesus Christ) and bringing up the liturgical books, among other things. If young, the server is commonly called an altar boy or altar girl. In some Christian denominations, altar servers are known as acolytes.

== Latin Church ==
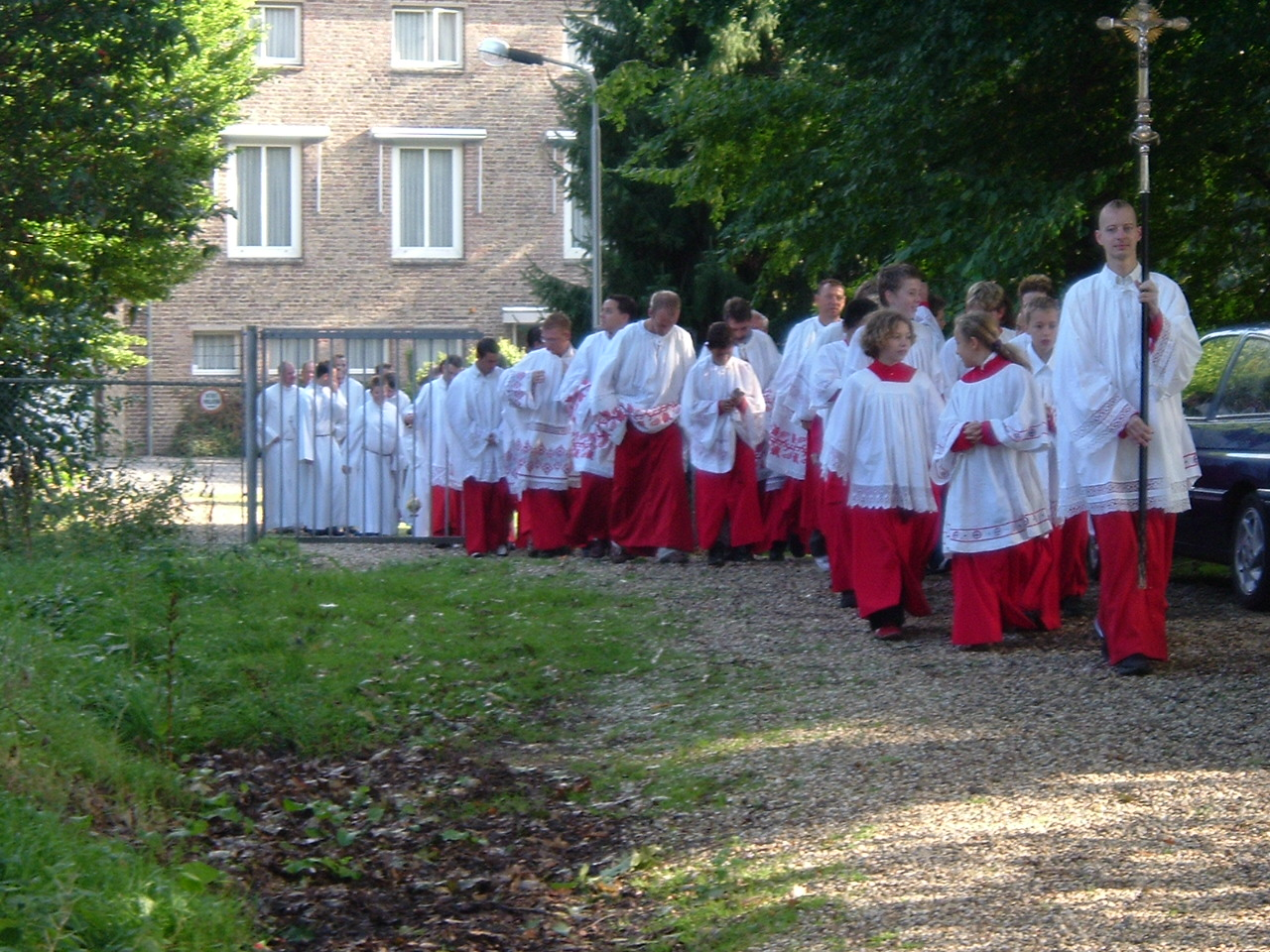
Fifty altar servers, during a celebration of a 50-year-old church, Gennep, Netherlands, September 2004

The Second Vatican Council's Constitution on the Sacred Liturgy confirmed that altar servers featured among those who "exercise a genuine liturgical function" within services such as the Mass. According to the General Instruction of the Roman Missal, "Mass should not be celebrated without a minister, or at least one of the faithful, except for a just and reasonable cause."

While the function of altar server is commonly associated with children, it can be and is carried out by people of any age or dignity.

=== Acolyte ===
As in other churches, altar servers are sometimes called acolytes in the Latin Church. Pope Benedict XVI spoke of Saint Tarcisius as "presumably an acolyte, that is, an altar server". However, within the Latin Church, the term "acolyte" is also used in a more restricted sense, often specified as "instituted acolyte", to mean an adult woman or man who has received the instituted ministry of that name. Acolytes in this narrower sense are not necessarily preparing for ordination as deacons and priests. They are authorized to carry out some functions, in particular that of cleansing the Eucharistic vessels, that are not entrusted to ordinary servers. Those who are to be ordained to the diaconate must be instituted as acolytes at least six months previously. This ministry was long classified in the Latin Church as a minor order, as by the Council of Trent. The General Instruction of the Roman Missal, which does not use the term "server" and instead speaks of altar servers generically among "other ministers", treats in detail of the functions of the "acolyte", often specifying "instituted acolyte".

=== Female altar servers ===
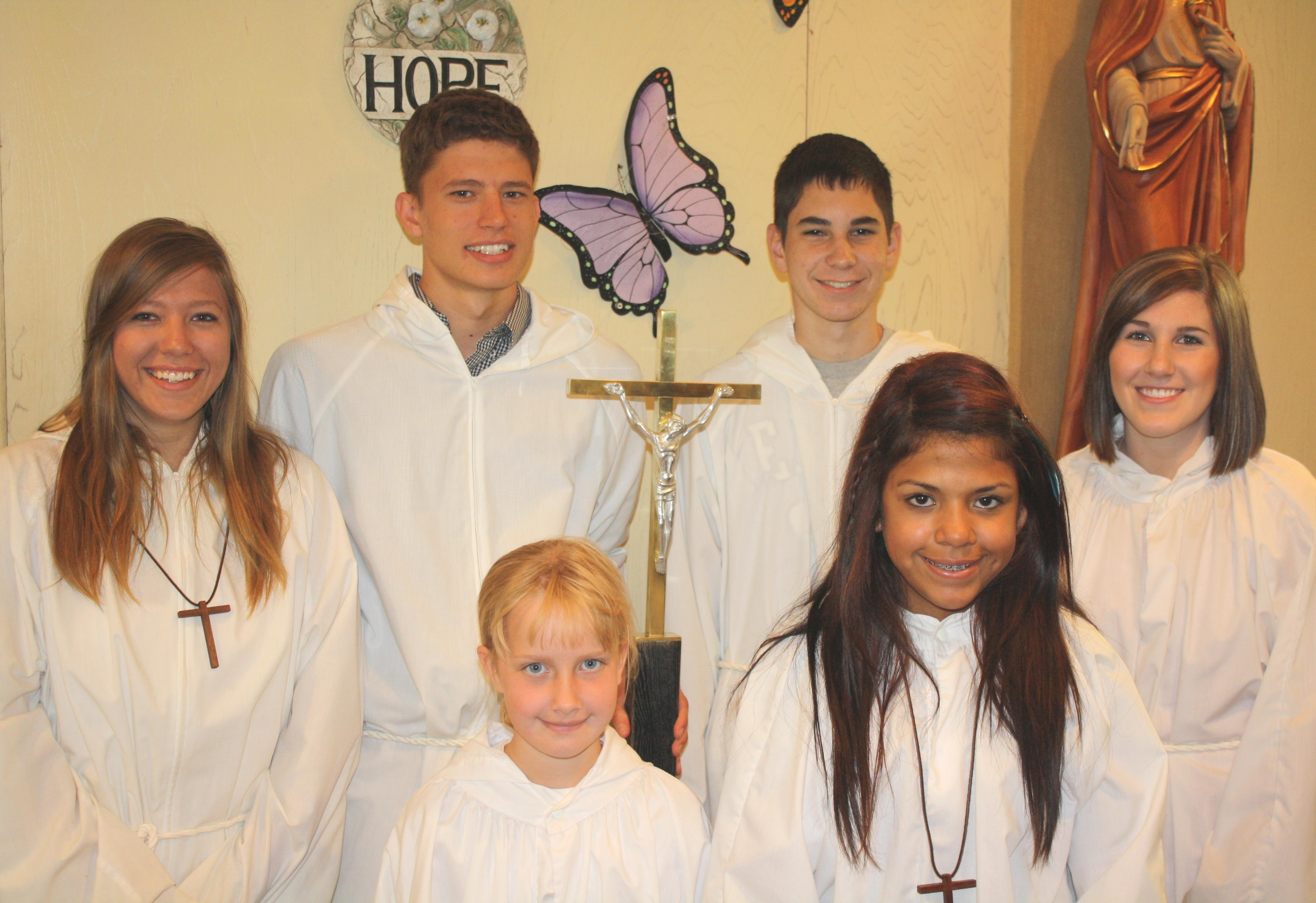
Since the 1990s, girls may serve at the altar in the Catholic Church. The Evangelical-Lutheran Churches have female altar servers as well.

The 1983 Code of Canon Law altered the juridical situation: without distinguishing between male and female, it declared: "Lay persons can fulfill the function of lector in liturgical actions by temporary designation. All lay persons can also perform the functions of commentator or cantor, or other functions, according to the norm of law." On 30 June 1992, the Pontifical Council for the Interpretation of Legislative Texts issued an authentic interpretation of that canon declaring that service of the altar is one of the "other functions" open to lay persons in general, without distinguishing between male and female.

In reference to this authentic interpretation, the Congregation for Divine Worship and the Discipline of the Sacraments sent on 15 March 1994 a circular letter to presidents of episcopal conferences, clarifying that the canon in question is only of permissive character. It does not require the use of female altar servers. It is thus for each diocesan bishop to decide whether to allow them in his diocese. A later document from 2001 states that even if a bishop permits female altar servers, the priest in charge of a church in that diocese is not obliged to recruit them, since no one, male or female, has a right to become an altar server. The document also states that "it will always be very appropriate to follow the noble tradition of having boys serve at the altar".

As priests in charge of churches are not obliged to avail of a diocesan bishop's permission in this matter, those belonging to traditionalist Catholic groups such as the Priestly Fraternity of Saint Peter, the Institute of Christ the King Sovereign Priest, the Institute of The Good Shepherd, the Society of Saint Pius X and the self-professed Catholic CMRI and some other priests do not.

In the United States, after the Diocese of Arlington permitted them, the Diocese of Lincoln, Nebraska in 2006 became the only diocese in the country that did not allow female altar servers. However, it was joined by a church in the Diocese of Phoenix in August 2011, when it was announced that girls would no longer be allowed to serve at the altar.

=== Duties at Mass ===
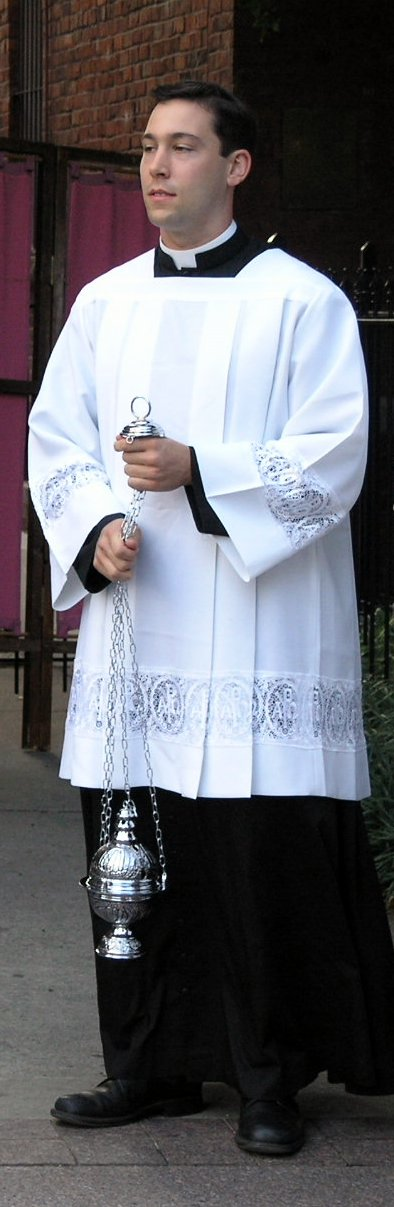
An altar server carrying a thurible is called a thurifer

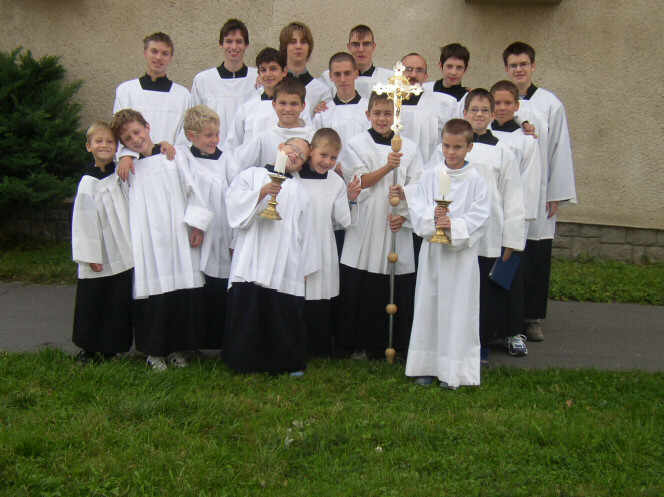
Altar servers in cassock and surplice and one in alb

In the absence of instituted acolytes, some of their functions at Mass may be carried out by altar servers.

- Servers hold liturgical books and blessed objects for the priest when he is not at the altar and is proclaiming the presidential prayers with outstretched hands. They bring and hold such things as books, thuribles, the lavabo water and towel, vessels to hold the consecrated bread, and microphones.
- Entrance: The entrance procession is led by a thurifer with burning incense (if incense is used at the Mass) and a cross-bearer carrying a processional cross, who is flanked on either side by another server bearing a lighted candle.
- Proclamation of the Gospel: If incense is used, a server presents to the priest at the Alleluia or other pre-Gospel chant the thurible and the incense that he puts in the thurible and blesses, and servers, who may carry the thurible and lighted candles, precede to the ambo the deacon or priest who proclaims the Gospel there.
- Preparation of the Gifts: One or more servers assist in arranging the corporal, the purificator(s), the chalice(s), the pall(s), and the Missal on the altar, leaving it to the deacon to take care of the sacred vessels. (At a concelebrated Mass without participation by a deacon, a concelebrating priest carries out the functions assigned to the deacon.) If, as is appropriate, the bread and wine for the Mass are presented by the faithful, servers assist the priest or deacon who receives these and perhaps other gifts and carry the bread and wine to the priest, placing other gifts in a place distinct from the altar. They present the cruets of wine and water for the priest or deacon to pour some into the chalice. If incense is used, a server presents the thurible and incense to the priest, who incenses the offerings, the cross and the altar, after which the deacon or a server incenses the priest and the people. When the priest then washes his hands standing at the side of the altar, a server pours the water over them.
- Consecration: An altar server rings a bell shortly before the consecration, generally at the epiclesis (when the priest extends his hands above the gifts). In accordance with local custom, a server also rings a bell when, after the consecrations of the bread and wine, the priest shows the Host and then the Chalice. If incense is used, a server incenses the consecrated Host and the Chalice as these are being shown to the people.
- Sign of Peace: The priest or deacon may give the sign of peace to servers, while remaining within the sanctuary.
- Distribution of Holy Communion: In some places, it is customary for servers to assist at the distribution of Holy Communion by holding a communion-plate for communicants. Whether it is to be held by communicants or by a server, a communion-plate is placed on the credence table before Mass. Its use (held by the communicants) is prescribed when Holy Communion is given by intinction.
- Recessional: The servers lead the priest and any other clergy as at the entrance procession, except that a server who acted as thurifer at the entrance now follows the cross-bearer.
- If a bishop celebrates Mass solemnly, two servers, wearing vimpae, hold the mitre and the crosier, and present these at the appropriate times.

=== Vestments ===
The vestment common to all ordained and instituted ministers of whatever rank is an alb, which is to be tied at the waist with a cincture unless the alb is made to fit without cincture. Acolytes, readers and other lay ministers (such as altar servers) may wear either an alb or other appropriate attire as determined by the local episcopal conference.

Servers often wear cassock and surplice, with black and red being the most common colors for a server's cassock.

== Lutheran churches ==
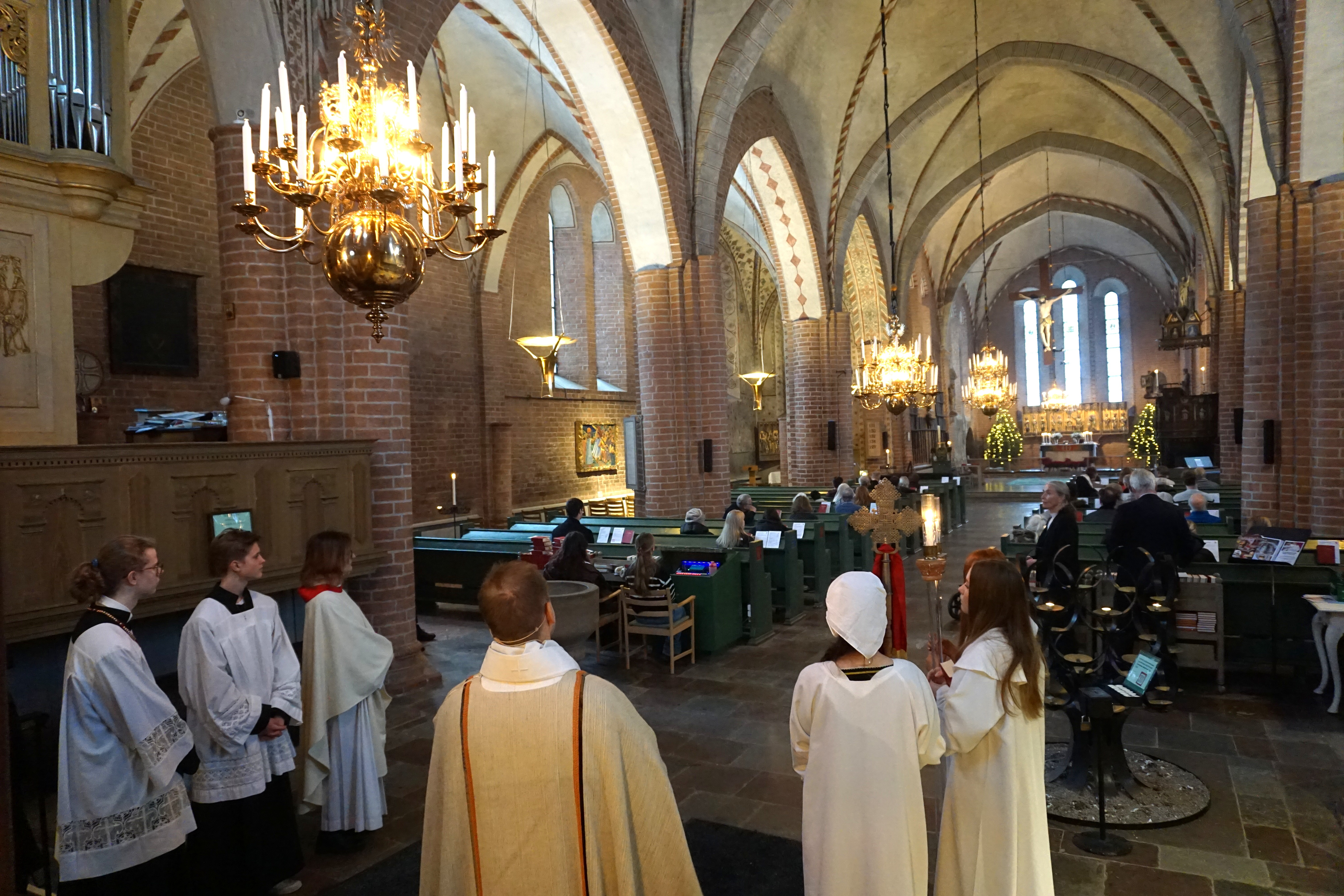
Priests and altar servers at St. Mary's Evangelical-Lutheran Church in Sigtuna, belonging to the Church of Sweden

In the Lutheran churches, altar servers (acolytes) have various responsibilities, such as ringing the church bells and lighting the candles in the chancel. The various acolytes in the Lutheran churches have different roles during the celebration of the Mass:

- Crucifer
- Thurifer
- Torchbearer
- Biblebearer
- Bannerbearer

Certain acolytes are assigned the role of crucifer or thurifer, who carry the processional cross and thurible respectively. The torchbearer stands to the side of the crucifer to carry candles, during the procession and recession. The bannerbearer typically carries a gonfalon in processions and recessions. The Bible bearer is tasked with placing "the Bible on the altar or missal stand until the Gospel procession."

Acolytes typically wear albs and the cincture used may reflect the colour of the liturgical season in the Christian calendar.

The role of the acolyte is considered important in Lutheranism as those who serve in these roles, typically youth, often develop an interest in holy orders.

== Byzantine Rite ==
Ukrainian Catholic bishop and priests during the Divine Liturgy, with altar servers in front (note the crossed oraria the servers are wearing)

In the Byzantine Rite, altar servers assist the higher clergy during services. They might carry the cross, candles or liturgical fans in processions and entrances; maintain the censer, ensuring it has enough live charcoal, loading it with incense and handing it to the priest or deacon when required; preparing the hot water (zeon) in time for it to be added to the chalice at the Divine Liturgy; prepare the antidoron for the people to receive after Holy Communion; and any other necessary tasks so that the priest need not be distracted during the service. An altar server is vested in the sticharion only.

In the early Church, before someone could be a server he had to be tonsured. Nowadays, in many places it is not necessary to be tonsured before one is allowed to serve (since the tonsure must be done by a bishop or higher-ranking priest). The rites of "Setting Aside a Taper-bearer" and "Tonsuring a Reader" have now been combined into one service. It is the custom in some traditions, such as the Greek Orthodox or Melkite Catholic, to allow tonsured altar servers to also vest in the orarion, worn crossed over the back like that of a subdeacon but with the ends hanging parallel in front. Among the Russians, however, the orarion is not usually worn by servers, but only by duly ordained subdeacons and deacons, with the exception that laymen who are blessed to perform some of the functions of subdeacons may sometimes be blessed to wear the orar.

Before vesting, the server must fold his sticharion and bring it to the priest for him to bless. The priest blesses and lays his hand on the folded sticharion. The server kisses the priest's hand and the Cross on the vestment, and then withdraws to vest. Any server who has not been tonsured must remove the sticharion when he receives Holy Communion, because communicants receive the Mysteries according to their order within the Church (so tonsured clergy vest while laymen remove their vestments). Before divesting at the end of the service, the server must receive the priest's blessing.

The minimum age varies by local circumstance, but boys must be mature enough to carry out their duties without disrupting the sanctity of the altar. Although it is common in North America for boys to act as altar servers, in some places this practice is virtually unknown and these duties are always carried out by adult men. In other places where altar servers are normally boys, adult men will not vest if called upon to serve. In yet other places, boys are not permitted to serve in the Altar on reaching their teens on the grounds that the young man is no longer innocent enough to serve in the altar.

Altar servers, regardless of age, are subject to all the normal restrictions for those not of higher clerical position. Anyone who is bleeding, or has an open sore, is not permitted to enter the altar. They may not touch the altar table or anything on it under any circumstances, nor the prothesis without a blessing. They may not touch the sacred vessels, the chalice and diskos (paten) at any time. They may not stand directly in front of the altar table or pass between the front of it and the iconostasis, but must cross between the altar and the High Place if they need to move to the opposite side.

In general, women do not serve in the altar except in women's monasteries. In that case they do not receive the clerical tonsure (though they must be tonsured nuns), and do not vest in the sticharion, but wear their normal religious habit for attending services, and serve at a certain distance from the actual altar table. Normally, only older nuns may serve in the altar; but the Hegumenia (Abbess) is permitted to enter even if she is younger. A few parishes have begun to use women as altar servers.

== Anglican Church ==
In Anglican churches of Anglo-Catholic churchmanship and some Episcopal churches, the vast majority of roles associated with an altar server are the same as those in the Latin Church, and the same titles for each individual role are retained from Catholic tradition – mostly restored during the Oxford Movement in the 19th century.

Unlike the Roman Church, lay servers and sacristans were not conferred into the minor order, as defined by the Council of Trent. These orders were not continued in the Anglican tradition.

== Eastern churches ==
In the Eastern Catholic, Eastern Lutheran, Oriental Orthodox, and in the Assyrian Church of the East and Ancient Church of the East churches, altar servers are commonly young and often play a role in their church or community.

== Other churches ==
In many Methodist churches, all who serve in the above positions are called acolytes.

== Gallery ==
Altar servers in art

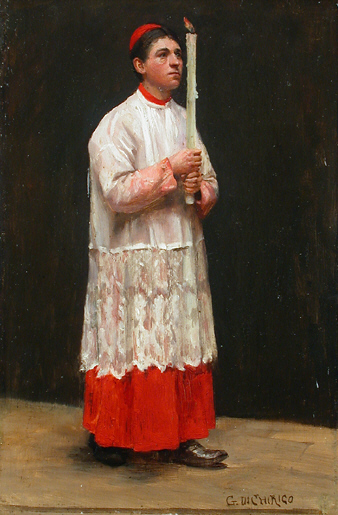
Altar server, by Giacomo di Chirico

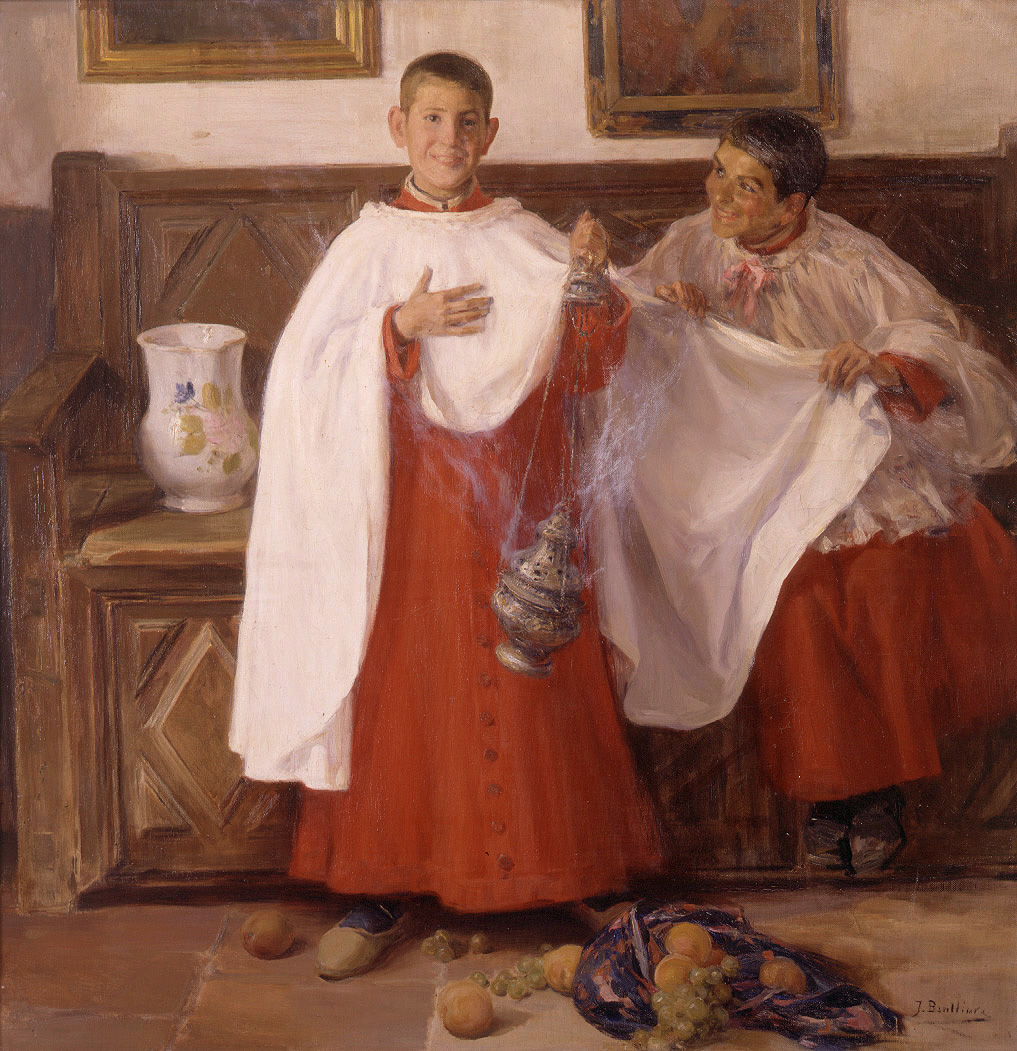
Escolanets, by José Benlliure y Gil

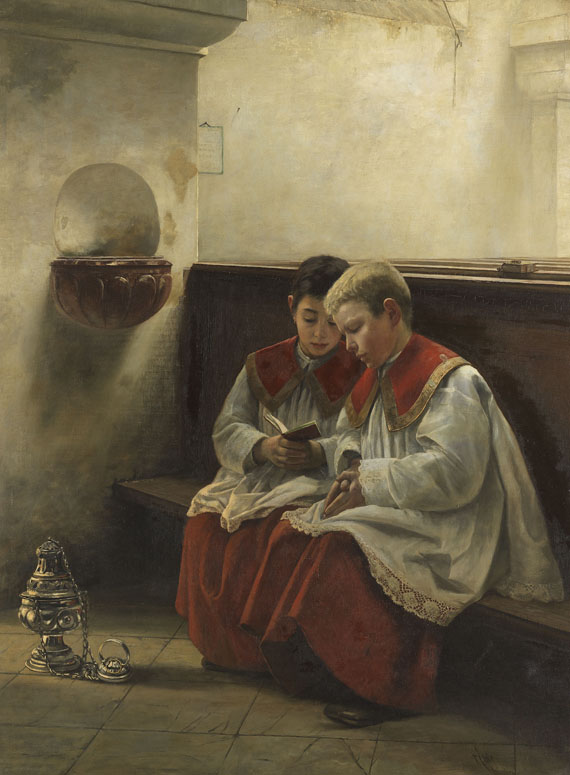
Ministranten beim Gebet by Felix von Ende, c. 1888

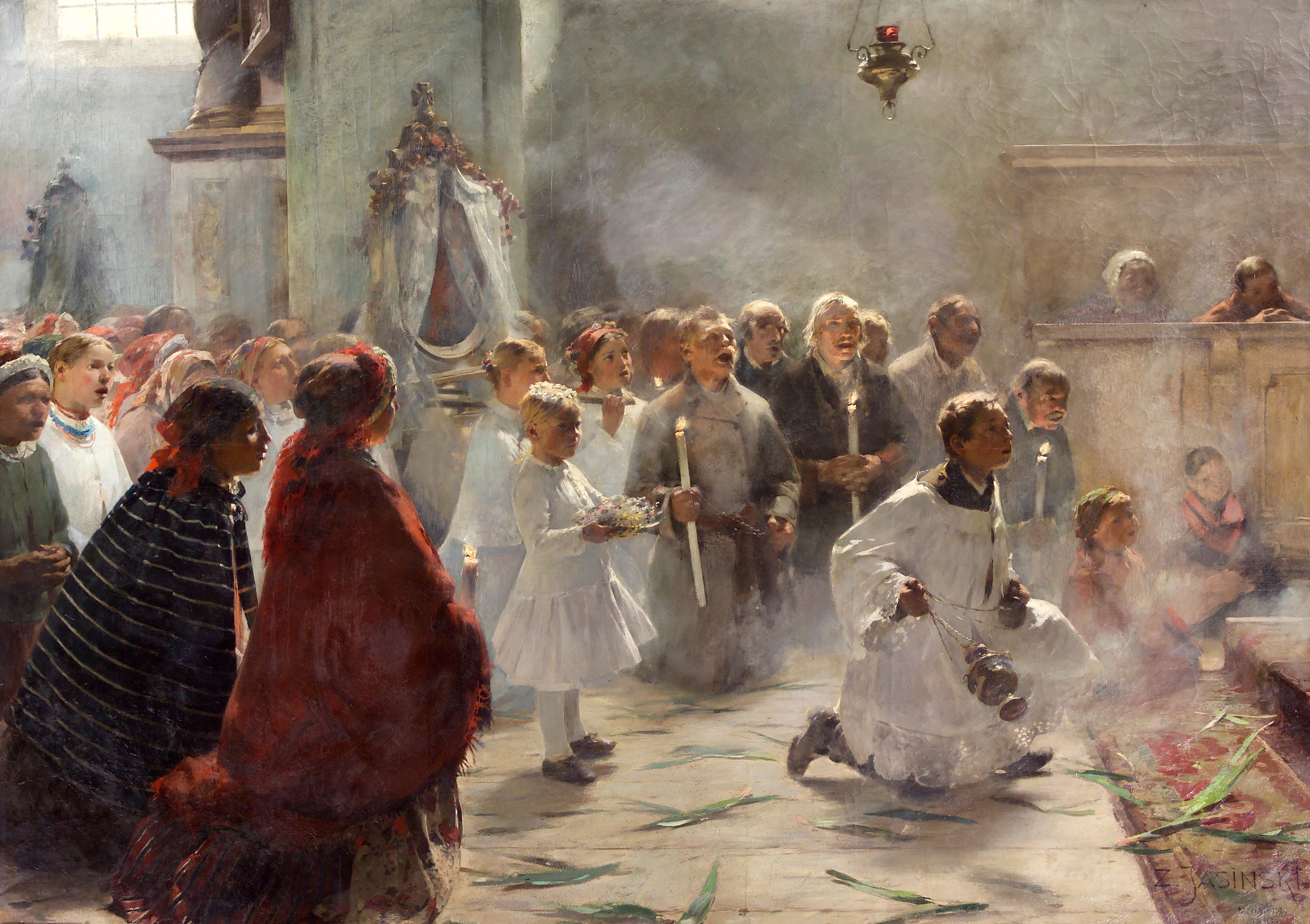
Palm Sunday mass by Zdzisław Jasiński, 1891

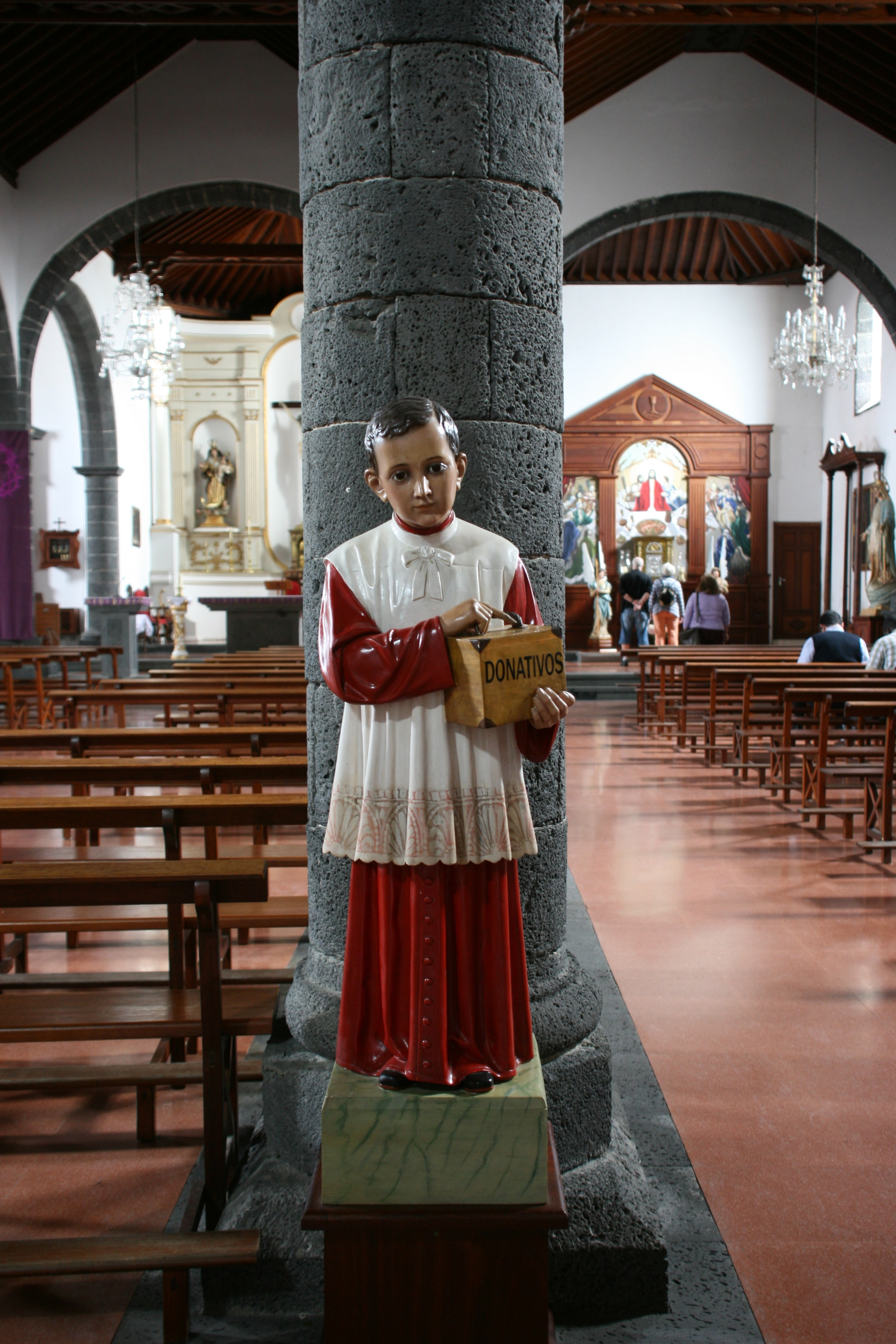
Statue of an altar server in the Iglesia de San Ginés in Arrecife, Lanzarote
