= Processional cross =

Cross or crucifix held during a Christian procession

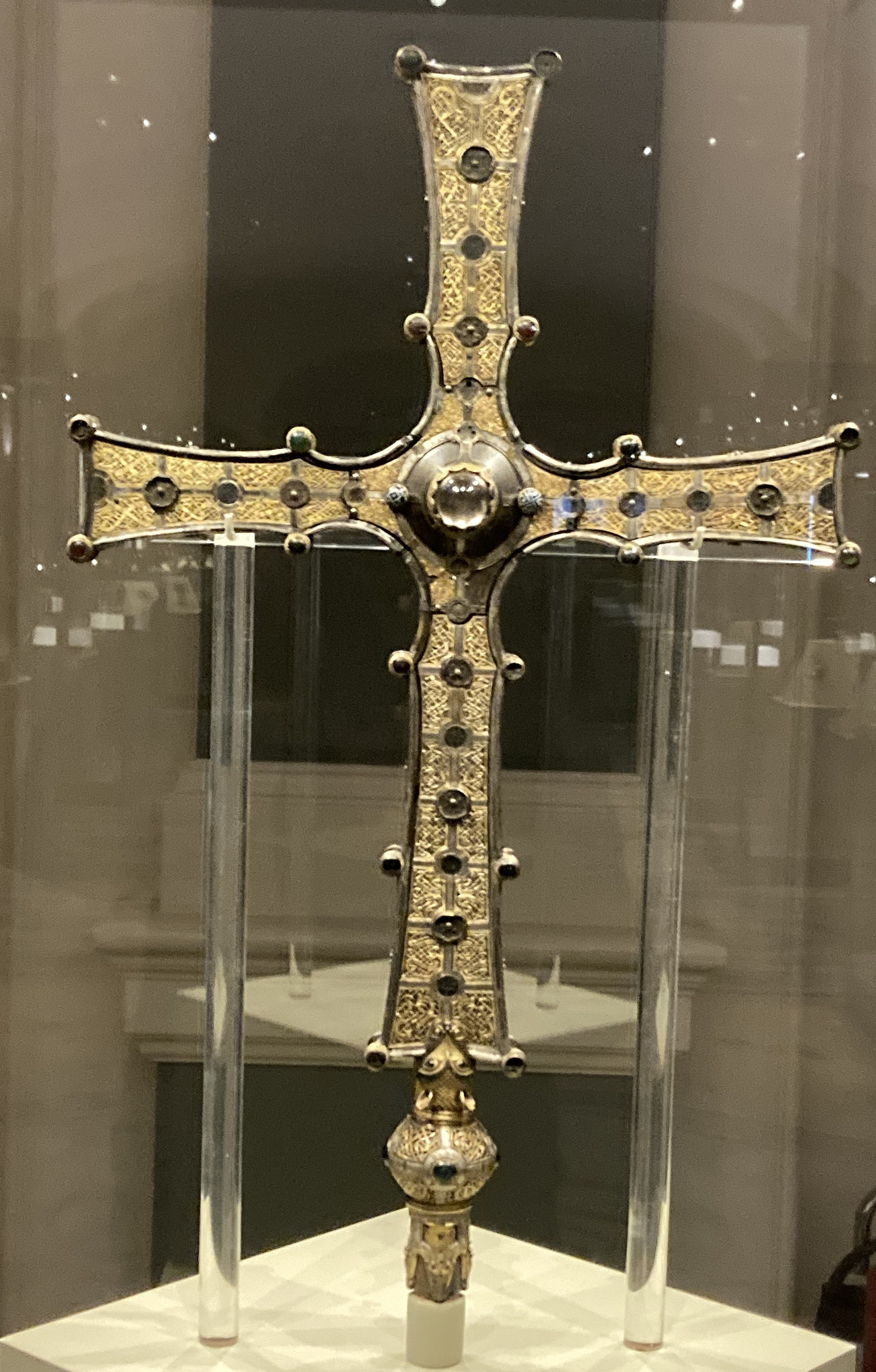
The Cross of Cong, Irish, 12th century

A processionional cross is carried during the entrance procession at an Evangelical-Lutheran Mass at Vadstena Abbey Church, Sweden.

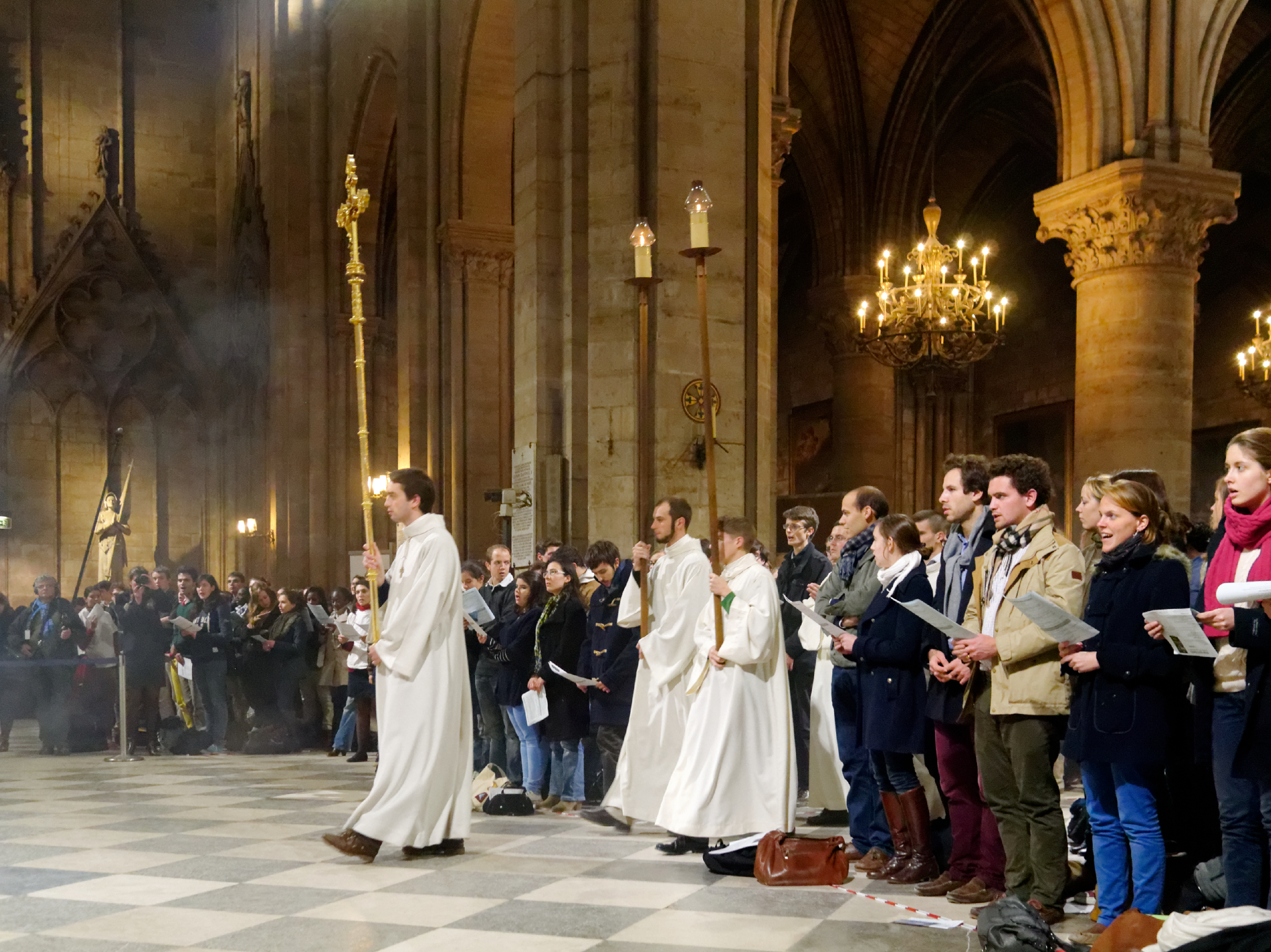
A processional cross carried during the entrance procession of a Catholic Mass

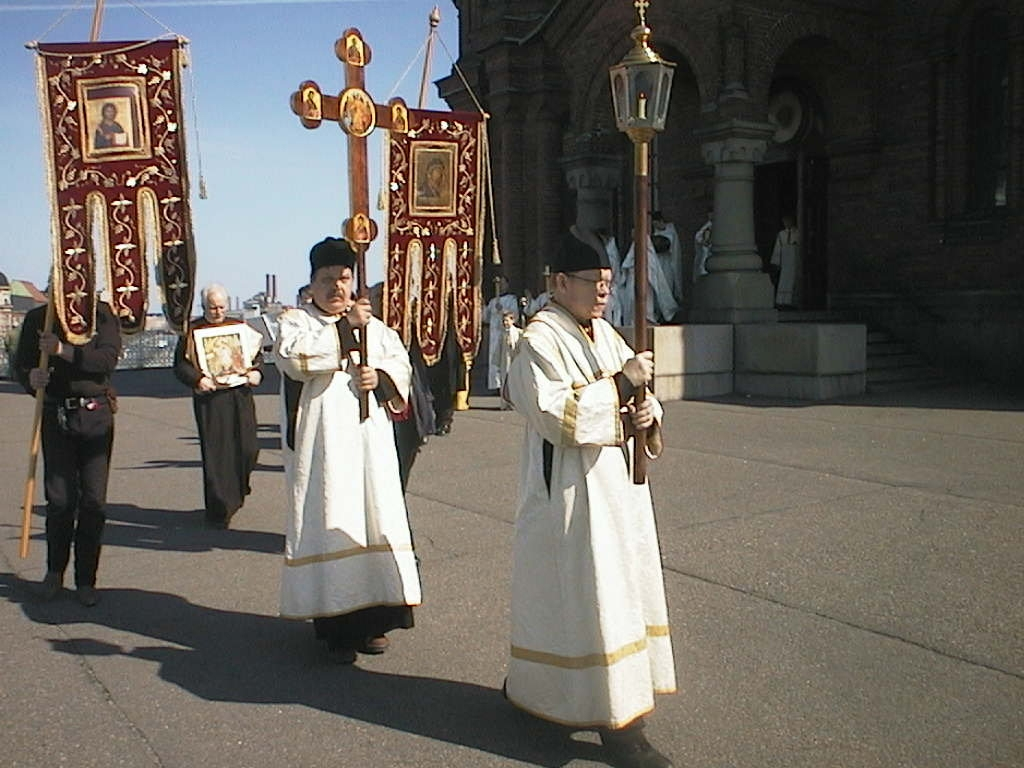
Russian Orthodox Crucession with lantern, processional cross and banners.

A processional cross is a cross or crucifix which is carried in Christian processions. Such crosses have a long history: the Gregorian mission of Saint Augustine of Canterbury to England carried one before them "like a standard", according to Bede. Other sources suggest that all churches were expected to possess one. They became detachable from their staffs, so that the earliest altar crosses were processional crosses placed on a stand at the end of the procession. In large churches the "crux gemmata", or richly jewelled cross in precious metal, was the preferred style. Notable early examples include the Cross of Justin II (possibly a hanging votive cross originally), Cross of Lothair, and Cross of Cong.

== Eastern Orthodoxy ==
In the Eastern Orthodox Church, there are different traditions surrounding the use of the processional cross. Traditional practice, still followed among churches of the Russian or other Slavic traditions, is that the use of the processional cross during the normal cycle of divine services is a primatial privilege, and will only be done when the Patriarch or First Hierarch is serving. In the modern Greek tradition, the processional Cross is often carried during the Entrance at Vespers, and during the Lesser and Great Entrances at the Divine Liturgy, regardless of whether the celebrant is a primate.

In all traditions, the cross is carried in outdoor processions, known as cross-processions for such events as Palm Sunday, Paschal Matins, during Bright Week, processions to honour the relics or icon of a saint, or on other festal occasions. On its patronal feast day a parish church or monastery will often serve a moleben (intercessory prayer service) during which a cross-procession will take place around the outside of the church. The processional cross is also used at funerals.

During an outdoor procession, the cross will usually be preceded by a large processional lantern and a deacon with thurible (incense). Religious banners and icons will follow. Then the chanters and clergy, and finally the people.

When not in use, the processional cross may be placed in the sanctuary, behind the Holy Table (altar).

Some Orthodox processional crosses will have an icon of the Crucifixion on one side, and the Resurrection on the other. The side with the Resurrection will face forward on Sundays and during the Paschal season, the Crucifixion will face forward on other days.

== Roman Catholicism, Lutheranism and Anglicanism ==
In the Roman Catholic, Lutheran and Anglican churches, processional crosses are used in processions and, in Roman Catholicism, Lutheranism and High Church Anglicanism, also preceded by incense. The processional cross in these denominations is usually flanked or followed with candles. The cross is brought up to the altar by an altar server who has been chosen to serve as crucifer.

Among Roman Catholics, Lutherans and High Church Anglicans, the processional cross will usually be a crucifix. In Nonconformist Protestant-oriented parishes, the processional cross will usually be an empty cross.

== Methodism ==
In some Methodist churches the processional cross is brought up to the Communion Table or Chancel by a crucifer at the beginning of the service and placed behind/ at the Communion Table, then acting as an Altar cross. The acolytes that follow then bow to the cross at the Communion Table. The Cross represents the Lord's presence at the Communion Table.

== Via Dolorosa ==
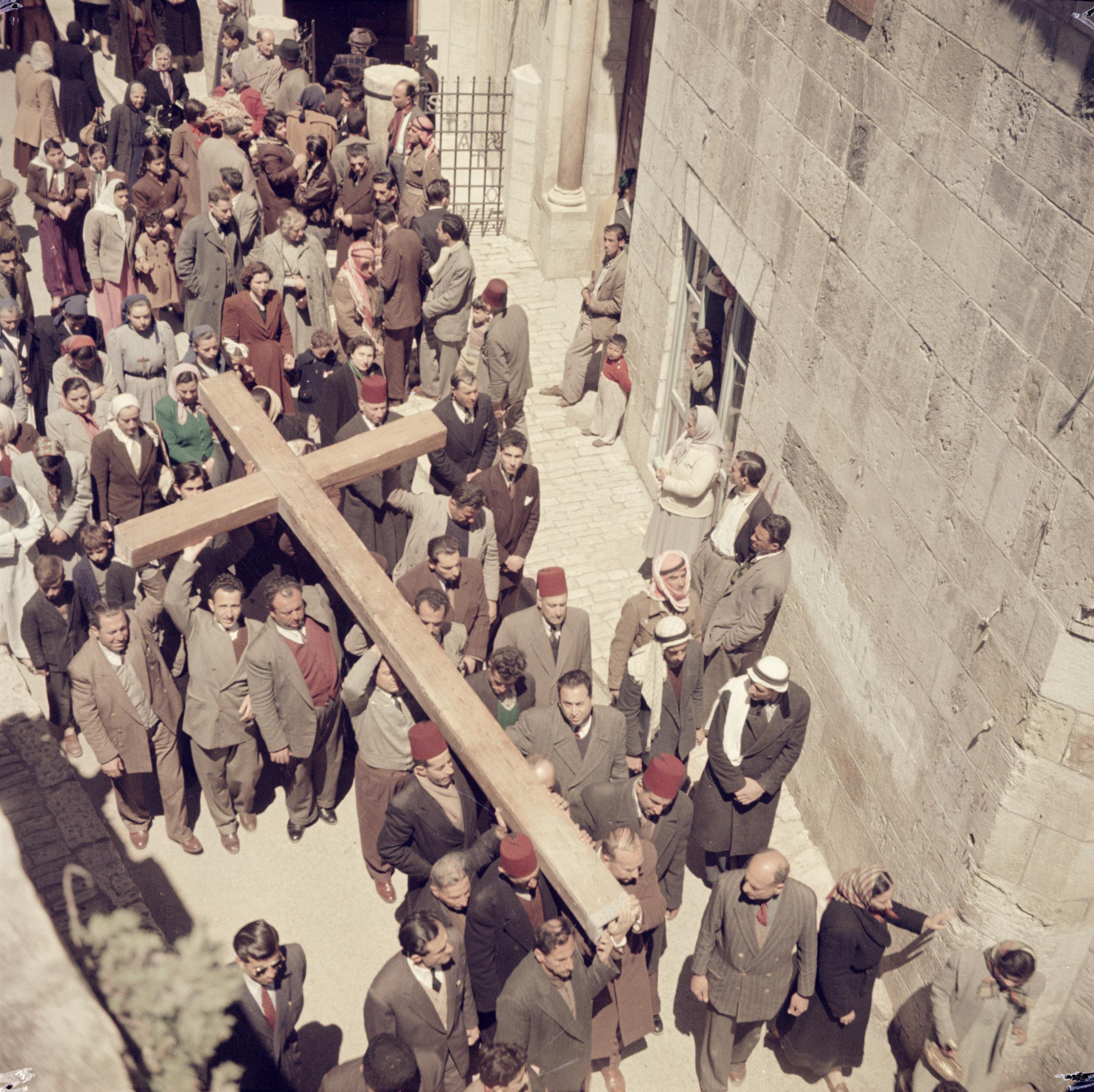
Pilgrims carrying the cross on the Via Dolorosa

Every Friday devout pilgrims visiting Jerusalem walk along Via Dolorosa in the footsteps of Jesus. They walk behind a group leader carrying a large wooden cross and pause at each of 14 stations along the route.

== Gallery ==
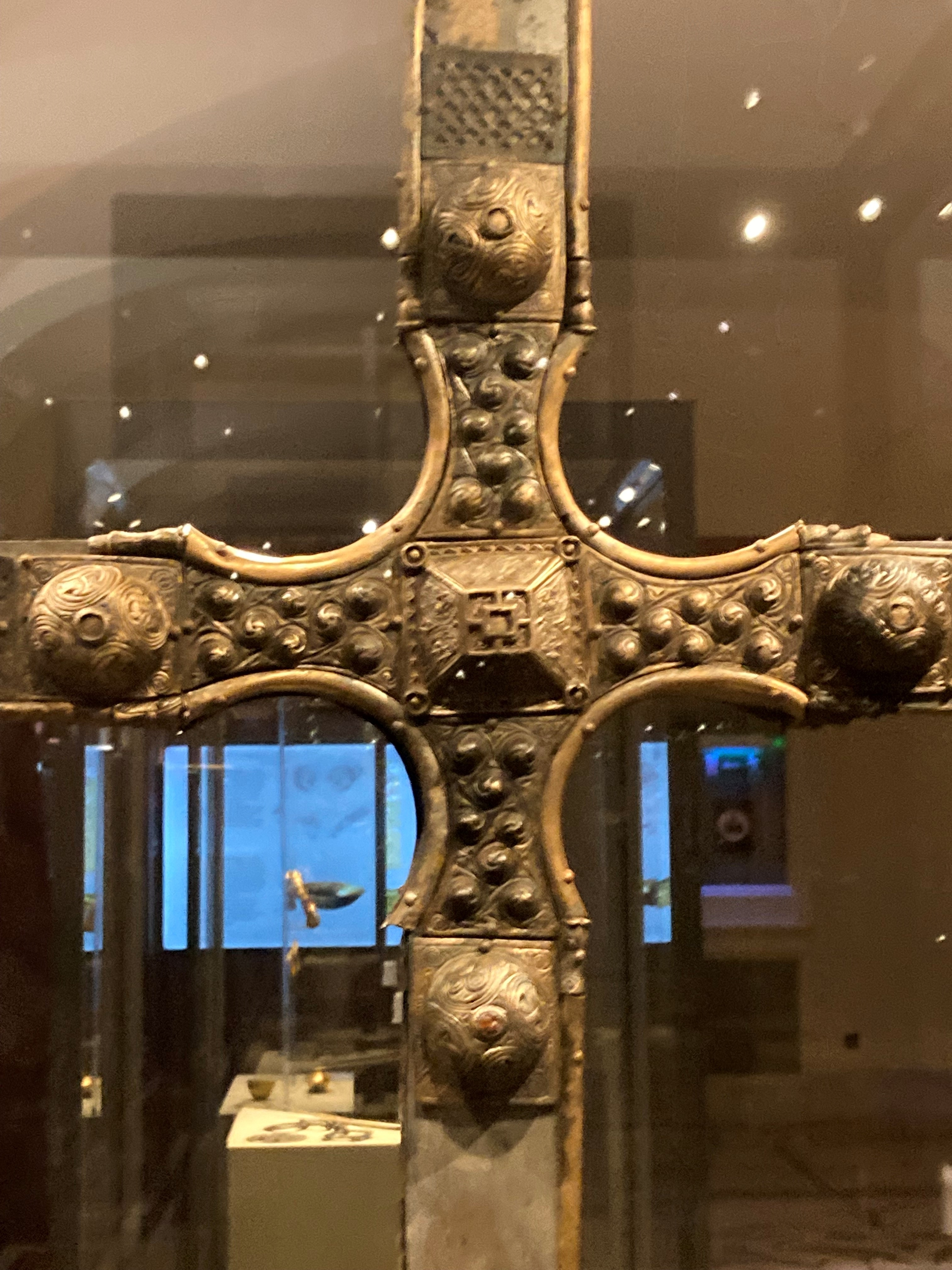
Head of the Tully Lough Cross. Irish, 8th or 9th century

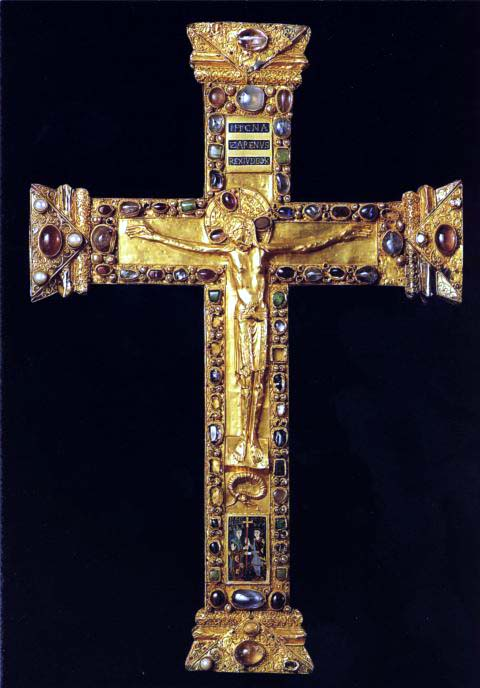
Ottonian processional crucifix, 10th century Essen cathedral.

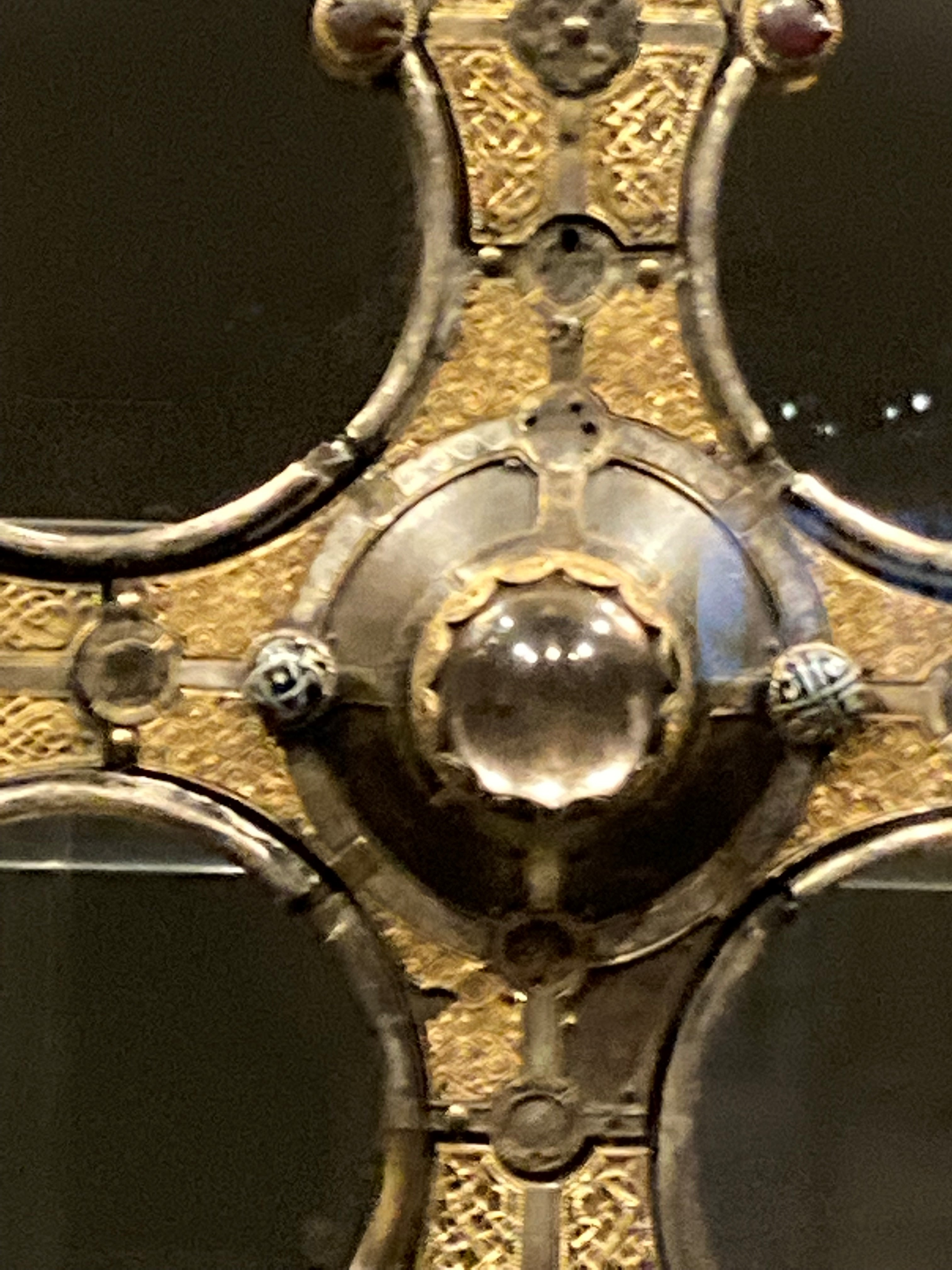
The Cross of Cong, the most highly decorated of the early 12th-century Irish Christian ornamented processional crosses.

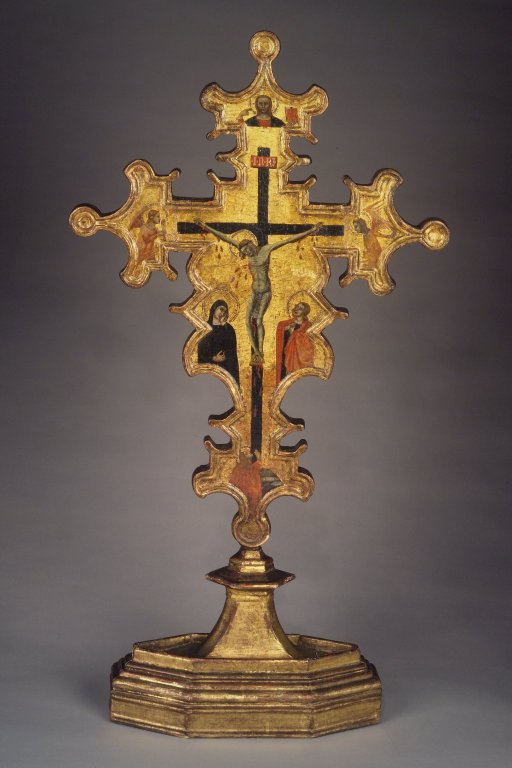
Double-Sided Processional Cross. Master of Monte del Lago, late 14th century, Brooklyn Museum

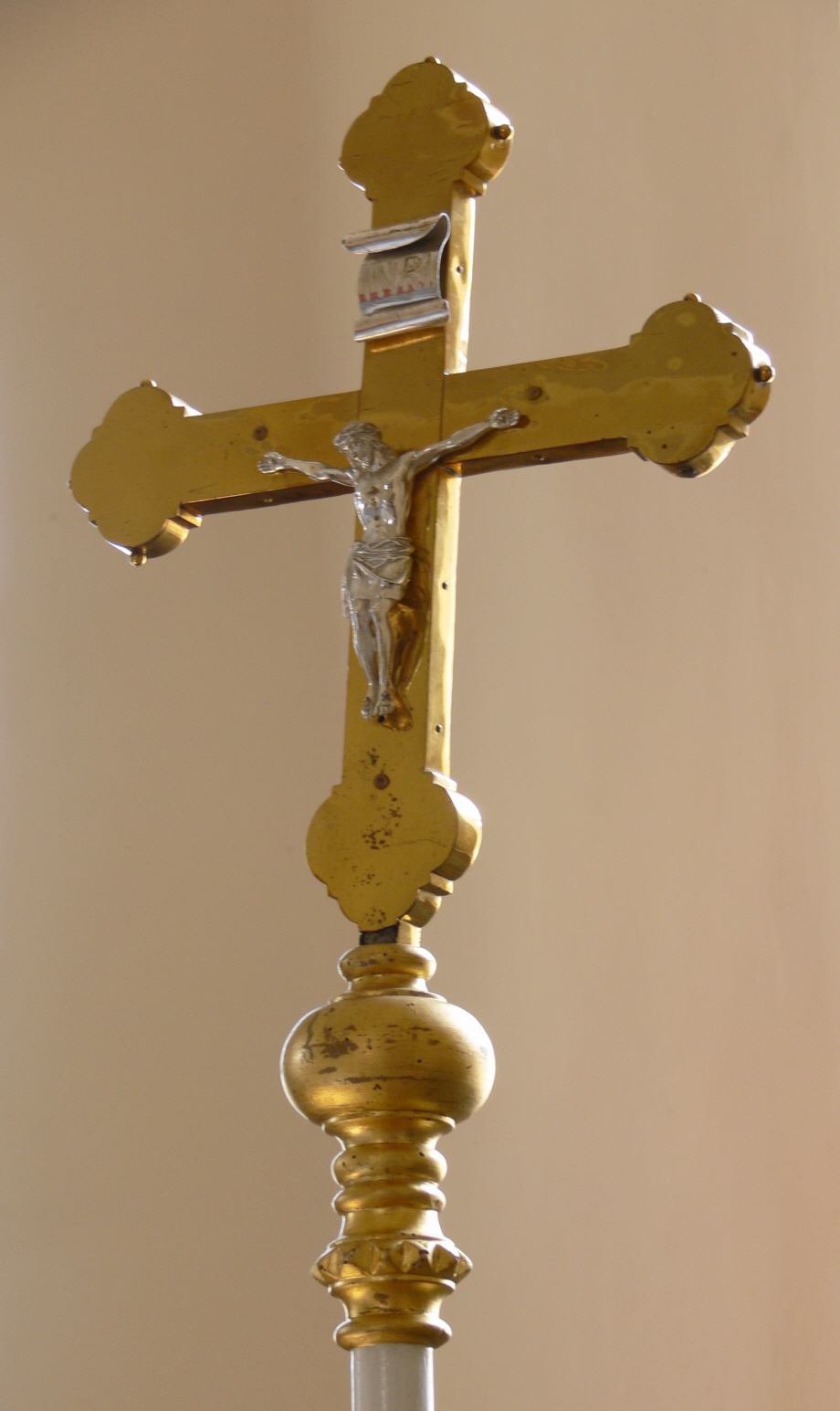
Catholic Processional crucifix (modern)

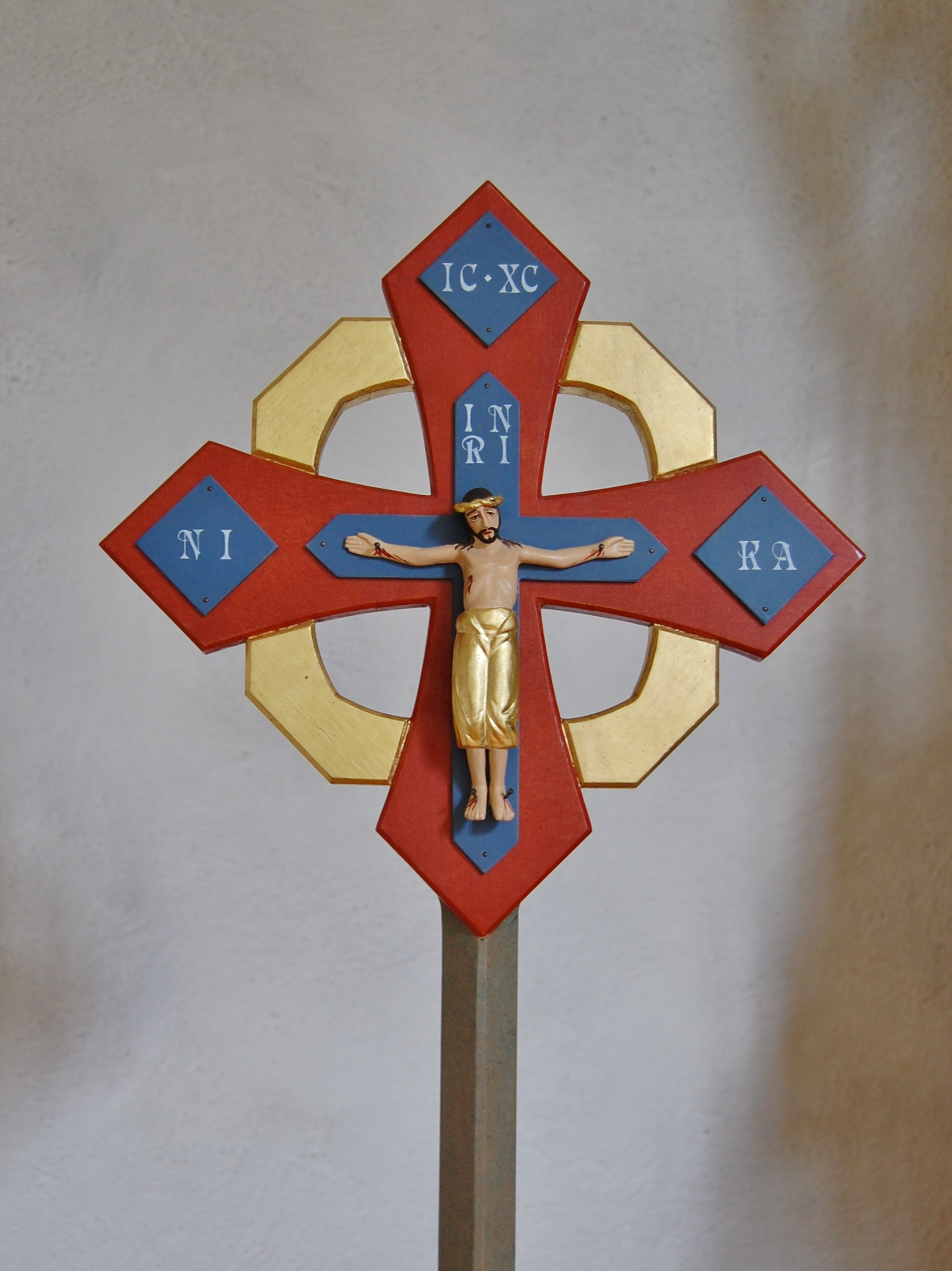
Lutheran Church of Sweden processional crucifix (modern)

== See also ==
- Crucifer
- Altar crucifix
