= Altar cross =

Christian liturgical object

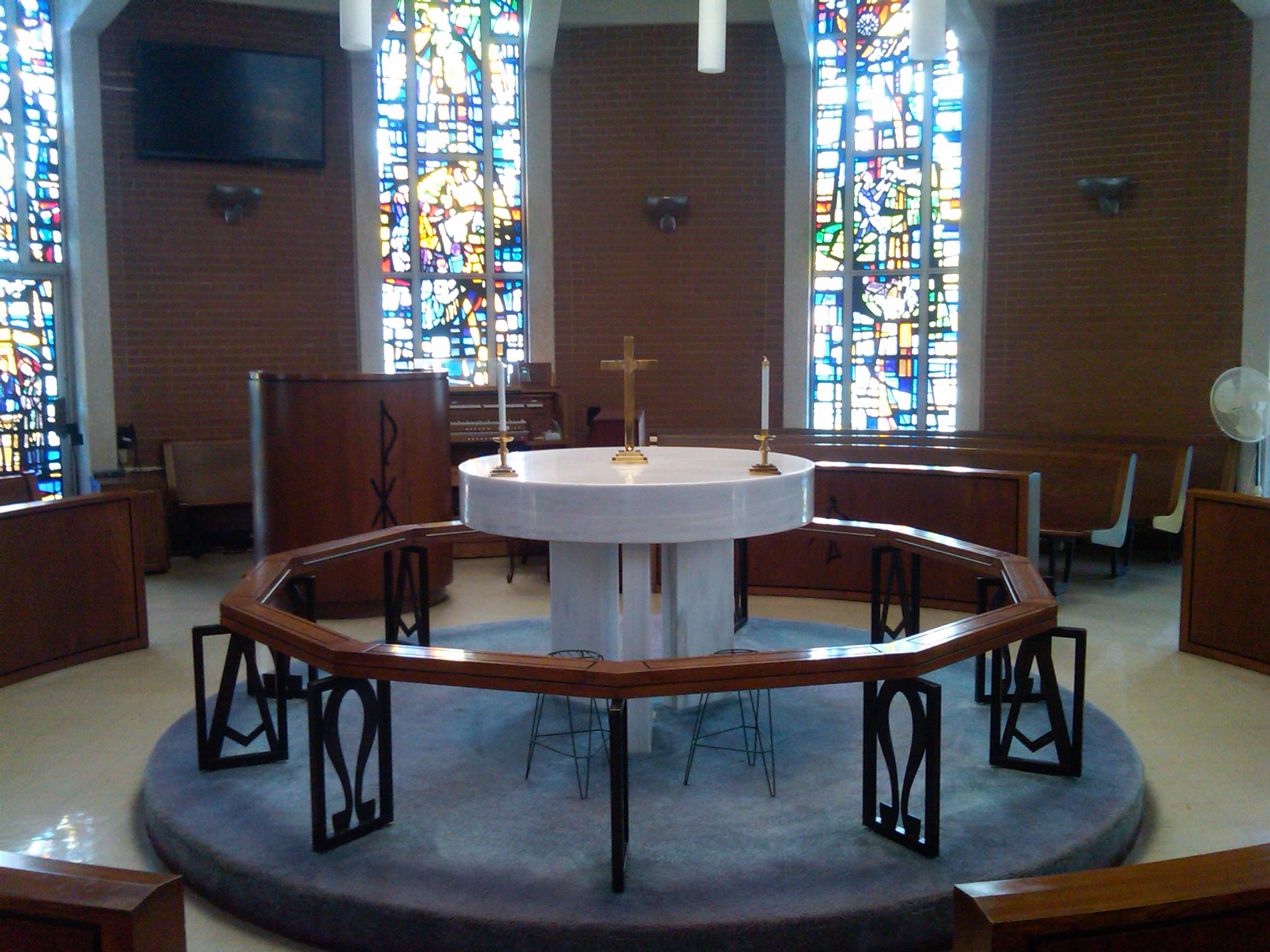
An altar cross in the center of an altar table of a Methodist chapel in Kent, Ohio, United States. The center of the altar cross contains the christogram "IHS".

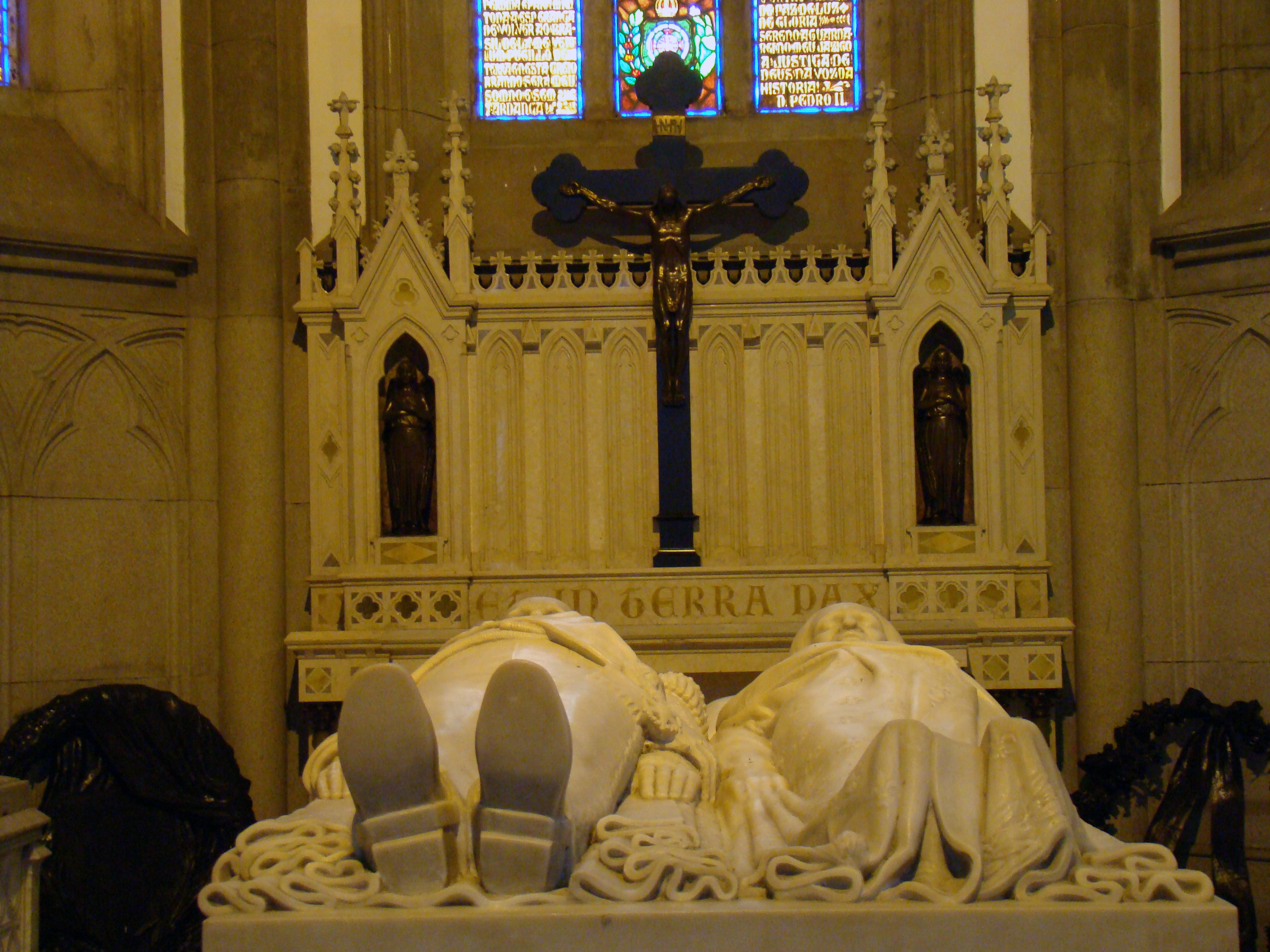
An altar with crucifix inside the Imperial Mausoleum at the Cathedral of Saint Peter of Alcantara in Petrópolis, Brazil. The foreground shows the tomb of Emperor Pedro II and Empress Teresa Cristina.

An altar cross or altar crucifix is a cross or crucifix placed upon an altar, and is often the principal ornament of the altar.

== History ==
Early Christians were wary of publicly exposing the cross or crucifix for fear of subjecting it to the insults of pagans, or scandalizing the weak. To avoid this, they often used symbols like the anchor or trident.

The first appearances of a cross upon the altar occurred approximately in the 6th century, although it remained unusual for several centuries, and even discouraged. When it was used, it seems to have been only during the actual service, and was likely a processional cross detachable from its staff, and placed on the altar after processing. This was at first almost always a cross rather than a true crucifix; these began to be made specifically for altars in the late 11th century, and became more common from the 12th century, though they may have been expensive at first.

By the start of the 13th century, treatises by Pope Innocent III expected there to be a cross between two candles on the altar during the Mass. This period was also the era when candlesticks, also probably carried in procession at the start of a service, started appearing upon altars instead of nearby, and as such marked a rather large evolution in the adornment of altars. Around the 14th century, altar crosses were almost universally replaced by crucifixes, probably now affordable by all churches, however, it was not until the 1570 Roman Missal of Pope Pius V that there is any mention of an obligation to have a crucifix on the altar.

== Purpose and use ==
=== Catholic Usage ===
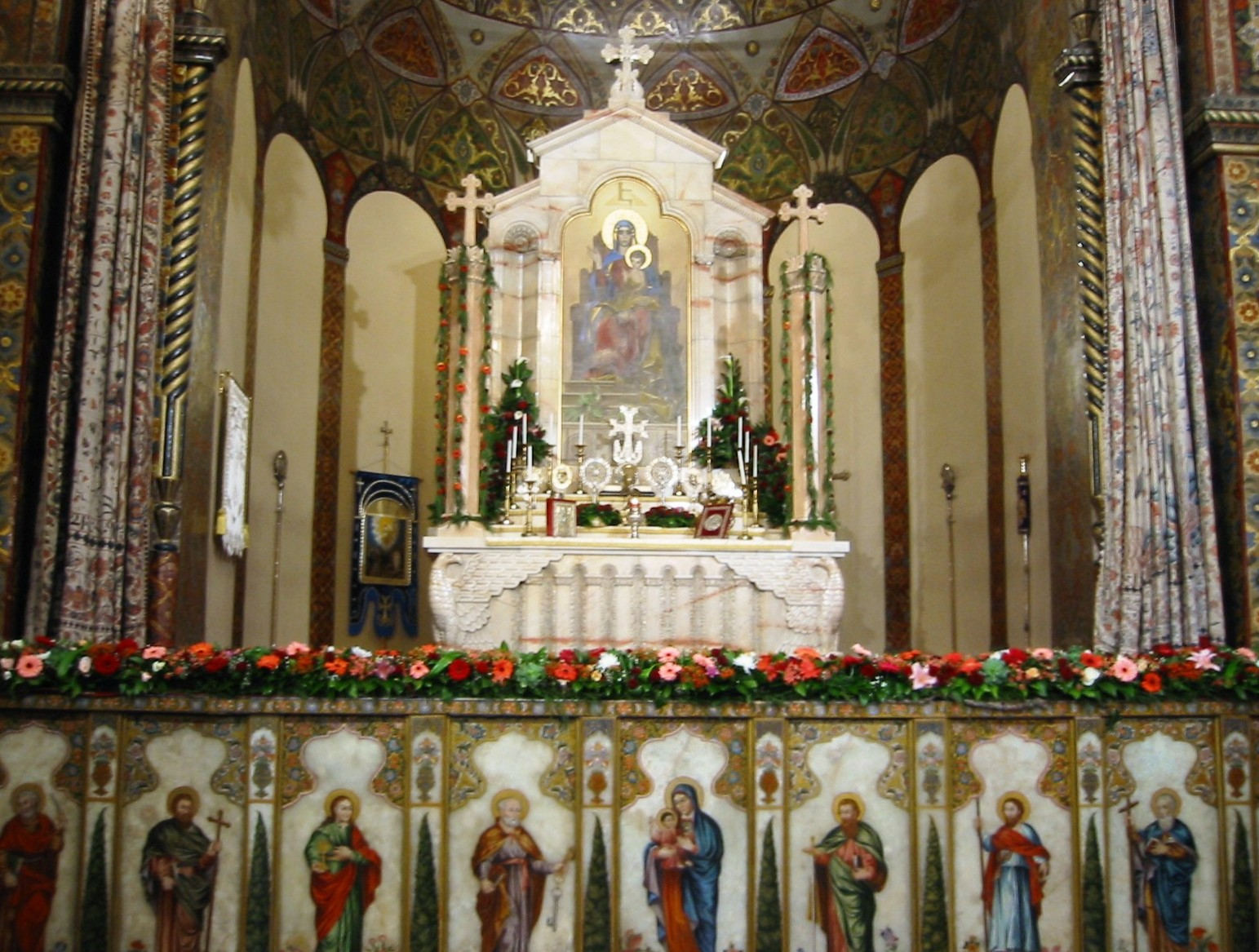
Altar with cross in the Armenian cathedral in Echmiatsin

Roman Catholic liturgical norms require a crucifix (with the corpus or body of Jesus) near or on the altar whenever Mass is celebrated. In some cases, to better fulfill this requirement, the crucifix is instead hung on the wall behind the altar, so that when the priest is facing the congregation the crucifix is not obstructed. In some churches, the crucifix is hung mid-air via chains or metal cords, directly above the altar itself. This is called a rood cross, which may also refer to a crucifix placed on a beam above the altar, along with figures of the Blessed Virgin Mary and Saint John the Apostle, or above a rood screen.

=== Protestant Usage ===
Usage of an altar cross, or sometimes a crucifix, varies widely by custom. Altar crucifixes are widely used in Evangelical-Lutheran churches. Evangelical-Lutheran churches retained both the altar and the crucifix (with the body of Jesus displayed) after the Reformation (altar crucifixes thus remain the norm in Europe). The influence of the Reformed tradition, which comprises the Protestant majority in North America, is reflected in the use of a plain altar cross rather than a crucifix. Anglicanism, which is historically a part of the Reformed tradition, has altar crosses though those congregations influenced by the Oxford Movement may make use of altar crucifixes.

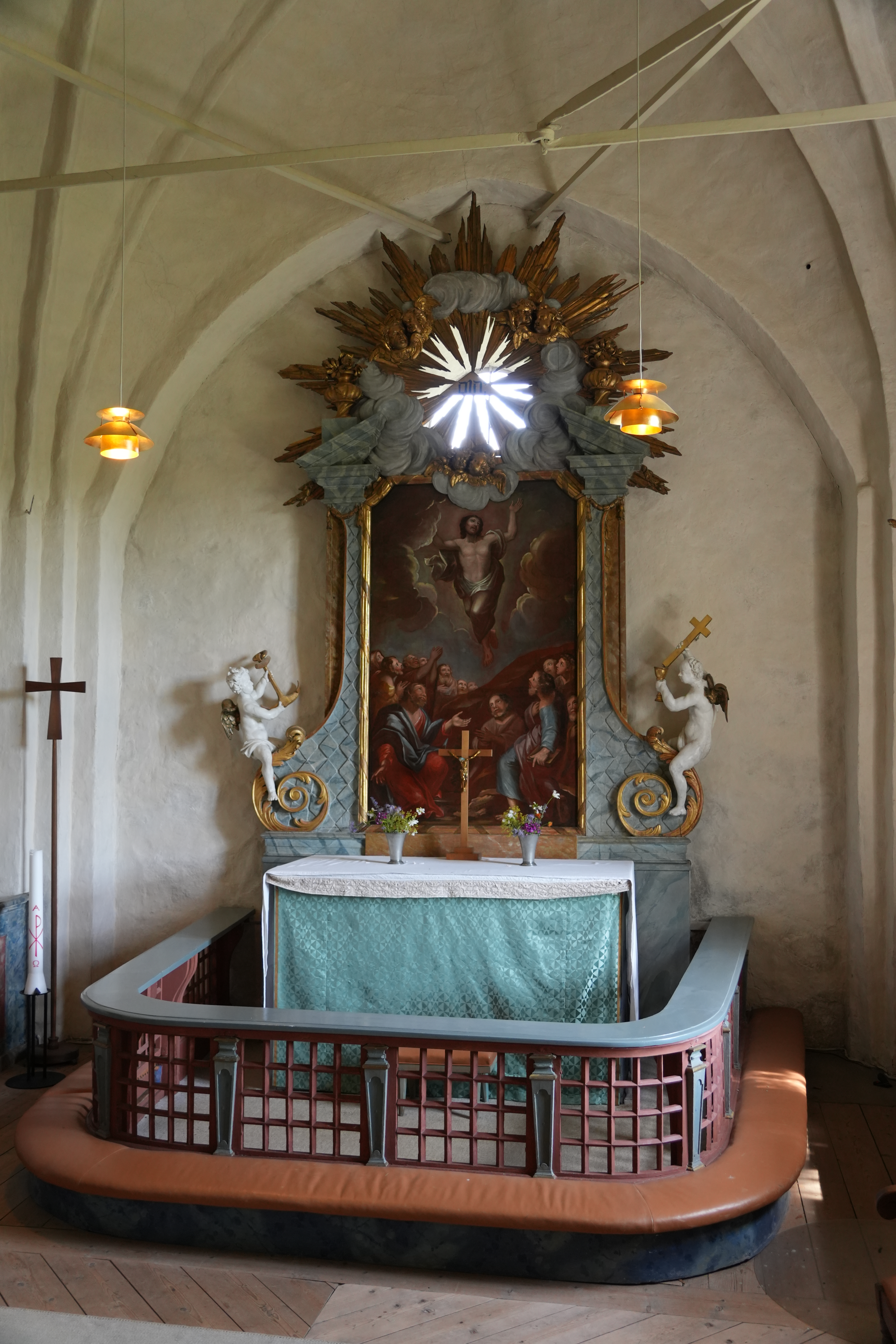
The altar crucifix of Husby-Sjuhundra Church (Evangelical-Lutheran) in Norrtälje, Sweden

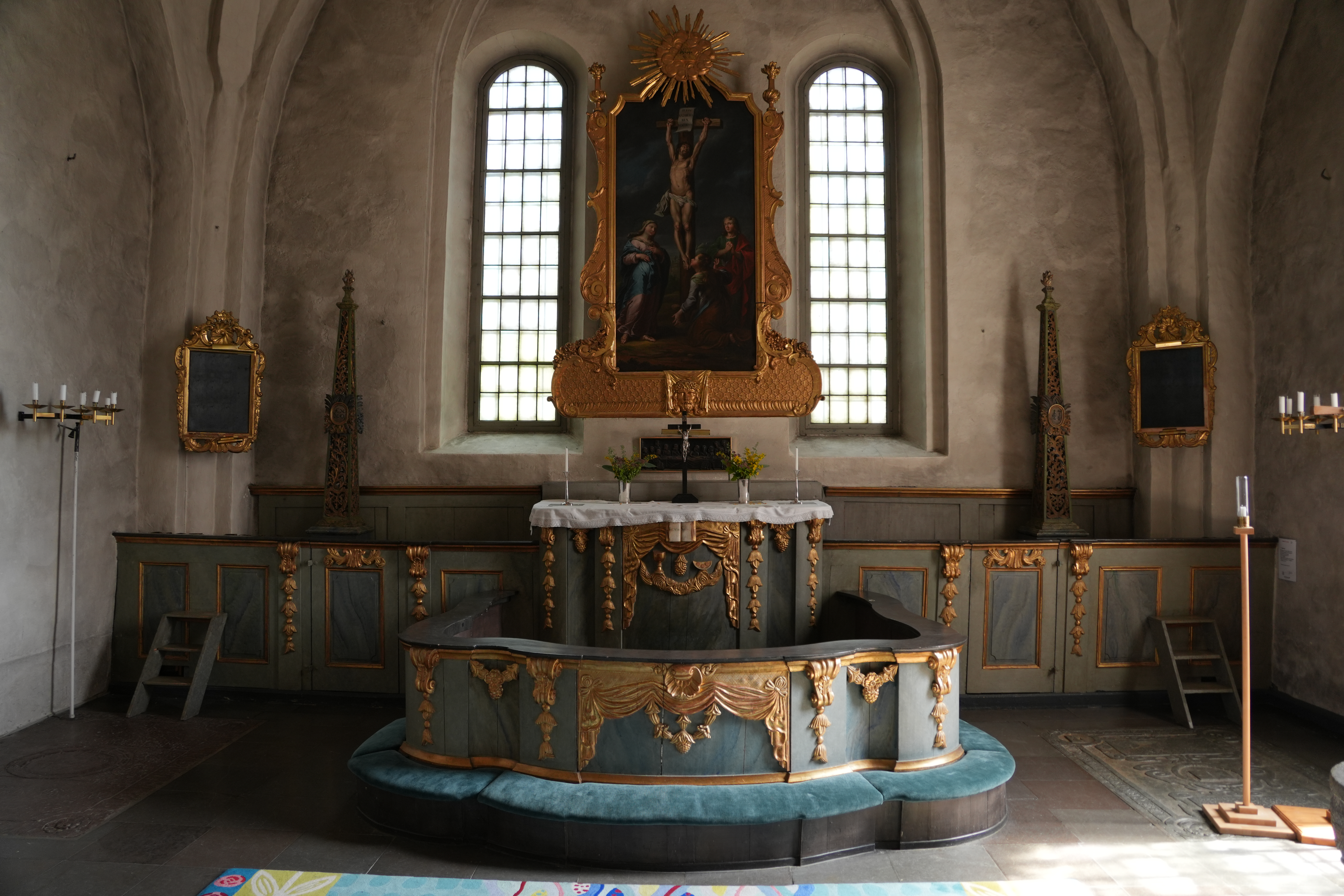
The altar crucifix of Frötuna Church (Evangelical-Lutheran) in Norrtälje, Sweden

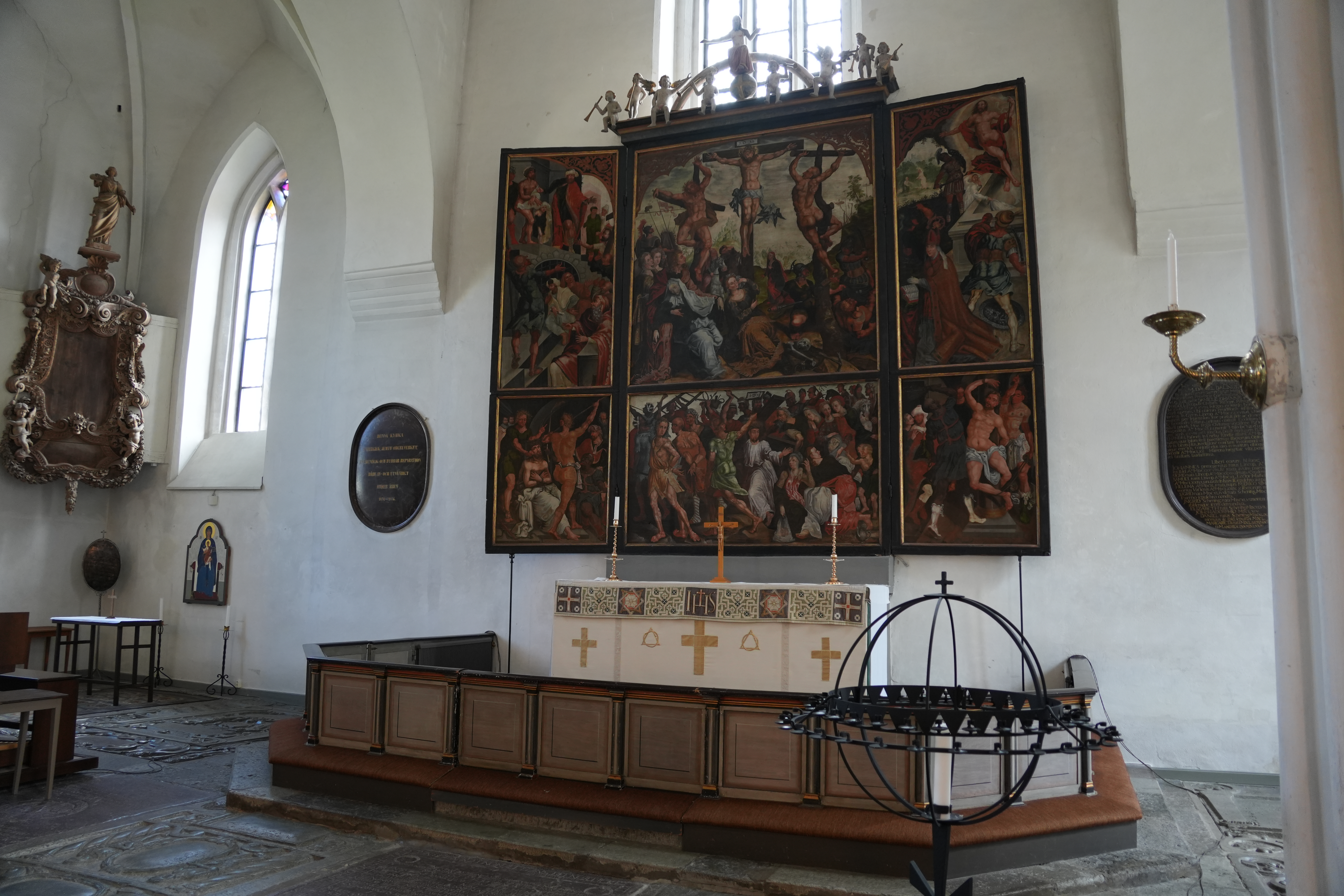
The altar crucifix of the Church of our Lady (Evangelical-Lutheran) in Skänninge, Sweden

== See also ==
- Processional cross
