= Liturgical fan in Eastern Christianity =

Liturgical object of the Orthodox Church

The ripidion, or hexapterygon (ἑξαπτέρυγον, meaning "six-winged") is a ceremonial fan used in Eastern Christian (Note: Including in the Orthodox Church, the Non-Chalcedonian or Oriental Orthodox Churches, the Assyrian Church, and the Eastern Catholic Churches) worship.

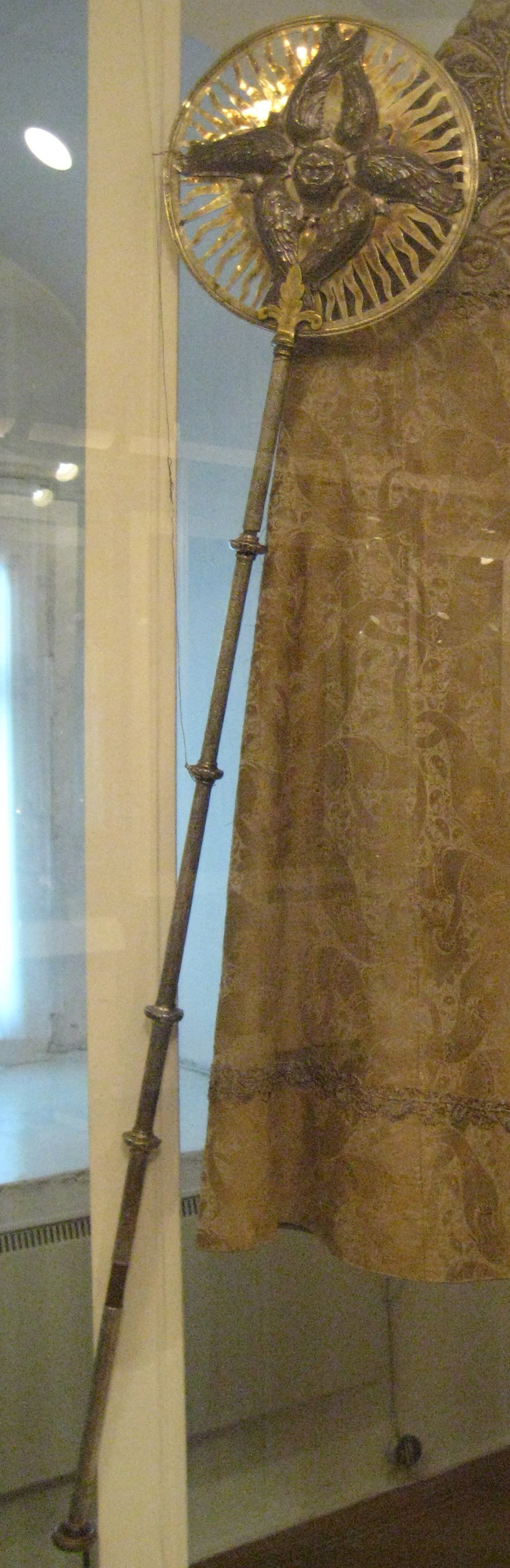
Eastern Christian ripidion, 19th century (Pskov museum).

In the Eastern Churches, liturgical fans have been used from the first centuries to the present day. A fan is generally made of metal, round, having the iconographic likeness of a six-winged seraphim and is set on the end of a pole. Fans of carved, gilded, or painted wood are also found. Fans are usually made in pairs.

== Byzantine Rite ==
=== At ordination of a deacon ===
Upon ordination, a deacon is vested with a certain protocol for each vestment, and then with the same protocol is given a fan and "places himself by the Holy Table, and fans the Holy Things."

=== Other uses ===
Fans are carried by the altar servers at all processions with Eucharistic gifts and the Gospel Book. However, in the Russian tradition they are often also used to honor a particularly sacred icon or relic. When not in use, the fans are usually kept in stands behind the Holy Table, although in Slavic traditions they may be kept out of sight elsewhere in the altar, especially in northern Russia, where icons of Christ and the Theotokos are usually placed behind the Holy Table.

== Other rites ==
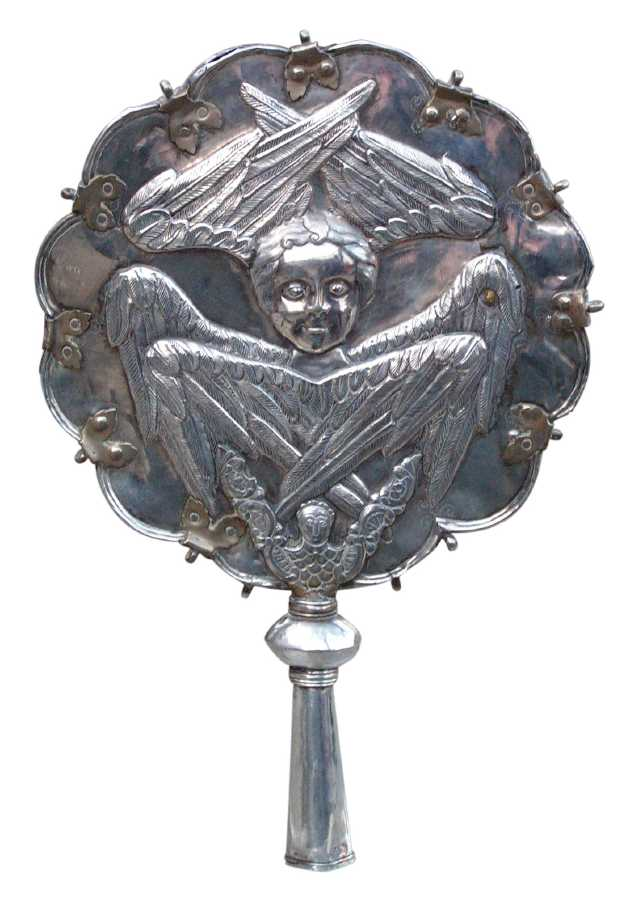
Armenian silver ripidion, with six-winged seraphim

Fans used in the Armenian (also known as Kshots/Kshotz) and the Maronite (also known as marwaha/marwahah) and Oriental (Note: e.g., Coptic, Armenian, Ethiopian) traditions are distinctive, having little hoops of metal or bells all around the circumference of the disks, symbolizing the hymns of the angels to God. At particularly solemn points of the liturgy, these are shaken gently to produce a tinkling and jingling sound, akin to the sound of multiple altar bells.
