= Church tabernacle =

Container for consecrated hosts in some Christian traditions

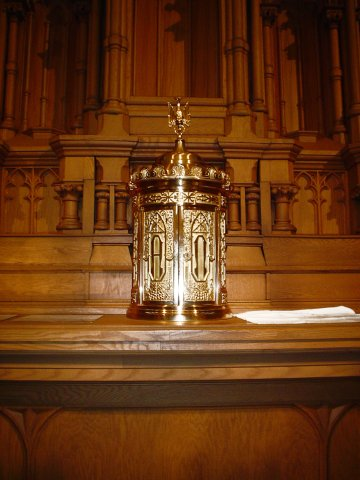
The tabernacle at St Raphael's Cathedral in Dubuque, Iowa, placed on the old high altar of the cathedral (cf. General Instruction of the Roman Missal, 315, a)

A tabernacle, also called a sacrament house, is a fixed, locked receptacle, usually located in a church or chapel, in which the Eucharist is reserved as part of the practice of keeping the "reserved sacrament". The word tabernacle means "dwelling place", which now refers to the place where "Christ dwells in the Eucharist". A container for the same purpose that is set directly into a wall is called an aumbry and has historically been used in this way in Western churches.

Within the Catholic Church, Eastern Orthodoxy, and some Lutheran and Anglican traditions, the tabernacle functions as a box-like or dome-like vessel used exclusively for the reservation of the consecrated Eucharist. It is ordinarily constructed of solid, non-transparent, durable materials such as metal, stone, or wood, is fitted with a lock, and is required by liturgical and canonical norms to be immovable and secured so as to protect the sacrament from profanation or unauthorized removal. Since these denominations believe the Eucharist contains the real presence of Jesus, they utilize the term tabernacle to signal God's presence among the believers.

The "reserved Eucharist" is secured in the tabernacle for distribution at services and to bring the Holy Communion to the sick. Within the Western Church, it serves as a focal point for reflection, meditation, and prayer. Until the late 20th century, the Christian tabernacle must be covered with a tent-like veil, otherwise known as conopaeum, or have curtains across it when the Eucharist is present within, including the colors white, gold, or the priest's liturgical colors. The purposes of conopaeum is "a sign of the reservation of the Blessed Sacrament as is the lamp which is kept burning before the tabernacle". Although this tradition is no longer required, it continues to be the tradition in many places, especially in traditionalist settings.

Catholics and Orthodox laymen also refer to the Blessed Virgin Mary as the tabernacle in their devotions, as being the "Mother of God" or Theotokos, the Virgin Mary carried within her the body of Christ.

== History ==
=== In Antiquity ===
In early Christianity, priests delivered bread consecrated at their Eucharist to the homes of the sick and others unable to attend the celebration. Laypeople were sometimes commissioned for this purpose. When the Edict of Milan ended persecution and the early Church was allowed to practise its religion publicly, the Eucharist was no longer safeguarded in private Christian homes, but was instead reserved near the altars of churches.

At this time, the preferred containers or "tabernacles" had the form of a dove within a tower. The dove was typically gold, and the tower silver. Emperor Constantine gave to Saint Peter's Basilica in Rome, a gift of two such vessels, both gold and adorned with 250 white pearls. Similar vessels of silver towers and golden doves were also given to particular churches by Pope Innocent I and Pope Hilarius.

Such vessels came to be kept in a place called the sacrarium or pastophorium, away from the central body of the church and were suspended by fine chains from the middle of the canopy (hence called a ciborium or bread store) above the altar of the church. Later on, simpler vessels would also be used in place of the dove and tower.

=== Middle Ages ===
By the 13th century, the Eucharist was most often kept in a highly embellished cabinet inserted into the wall to the right or left of the altar. The lit altar lamp indicated the presence of Christ. This was in accordance with the 1215 Fourth Lateran Council, which decreed that the reserved sacrament be kept in a locked receptacle.

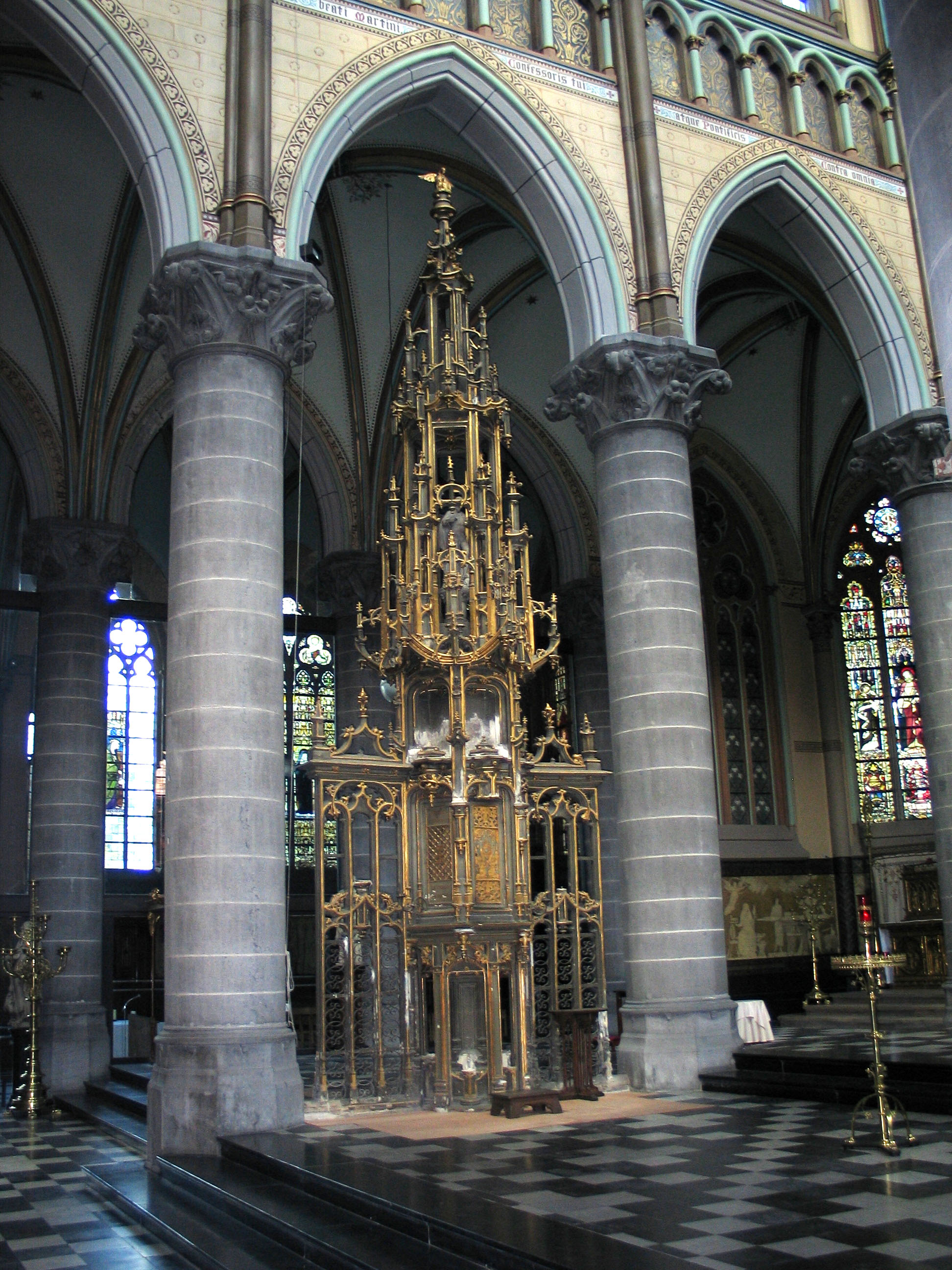
The ornate tabernacle in St Martin's church, Kortrijk, Belgium

The construction of ceremonial stone containers for the Eucharist began in the late 14th century, largely in northern Europe. German and Dutch churches from this period still display tall towers - known in German as Sakramentshäuser, and sacramentstorens in Dutch - usually placed to the north of the altar and near the ceiling. German examples of this are found in the church of St. Lawrence in Nuremberg (18.7 m (61 ft)), the Minster of Salem (16 m (52 ft)), Saints Peter and Paul City Church in Weil der Stadt (over 11 m (36 ft)), the Church of Our Lady in Lübeck (9.5 m (31 ft)), and St. Mary's Cathedral in Fürstenwalde upon Spree. Belgian churches with such sacrament towers include St. Catherine's in Zuurbemde, St. Martin's in Kortrijk, St. Peter's and St. James's in Leuven, St. James's in Bruges and St. Leonard's in Zoutleeuw.

=== The Renaissance ===
In the early 16th century, Bishop Matteo Giberti enacted edicts through the Diocese of Verona which proclaimed that the container for the consecrated bread should be placed on the altar. The custom then spread throughout northern Italy. Saint Charles Borromeo, who became Archbishop of Milan in 1560, had the sacrament moved from the sacristy to the altar (though not the main altar) of his cathedral. The edition of the Roman Missal revised and promulgated by Pope Pius V in 1570 (see Tridentine Mass) still did not envisage placing the tabernacle on an altar: it decreed that the altar card, containing some of the principal prayers of the Mass, should rest against a cross placed midway on the altar. However, in 1614 Pope Paul V imposed on the churches of his diocese of Rome the rule of putting the tabernacle on an altar. In reaction to Protestantism's denial of the reality and permanence of the Real Presence of Christ, it became the practice to place the tabernacle in conspicuous places such as the high altar, making it more visible. Whether on the main altar of the church or in a special chapel, the tabernacle became larger and more ornate, eventually becoming the focal point wherever it was placed.

== Present day ==
=== Catholic Church ===
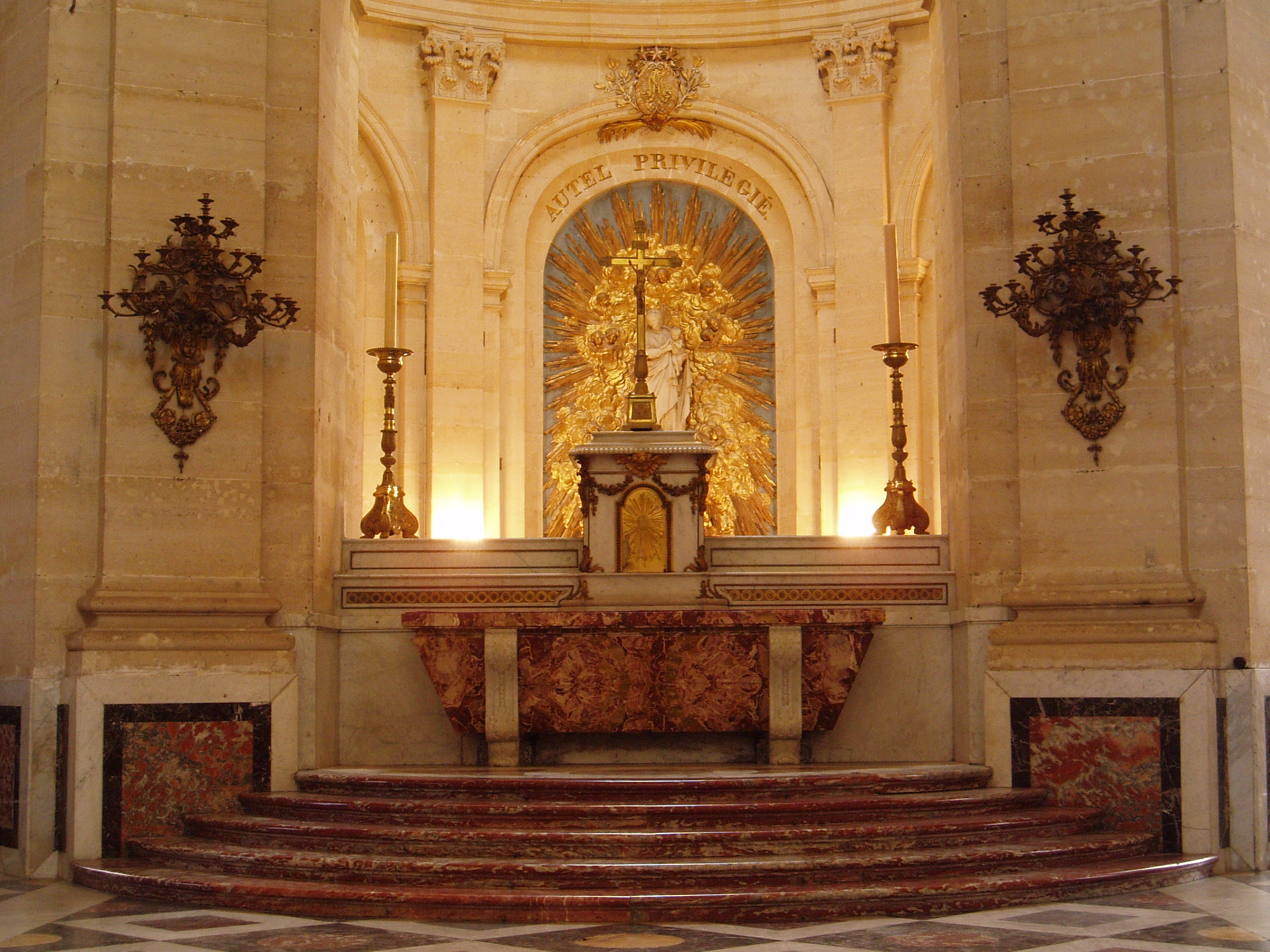
Tabernacle at Cathédrale Saint Louis de Versailles

The Catholic Church believes that the body and blood of Christ continue to be present in the bread and wine even after Mass is concluded. Therefore, a tabernacle serves as a secure and sacred place in which to store the Blessed Sacrament for carrying to the sick and others who cannot participate in Mass, or as a focus for the prayers of those who visit the church.

The renewal of the Roman Rite liturgy following the Second Vatican Council (see Mass of Paul VI) highlighted the primacy of the Eucharistic celebration. This liturgical renewal determined that the altar should be "truly the centre to which the attention of the whole congregation of the faithful naturally turns". Before Vatican II, Mass was often celebrated directly in front of the tabernacle. After Vatican II the altar for the celebration of Mass now stands on its own, and the tabernacle is given its own, usually smaller altar, or is placed on a nearby pedestal or in its own separate chapel. This allows the faithful to focus on the celebration of the Eucharistic action during Mass while providing the tabernacle with a place that fosters prayer and meditation outside of Mass.

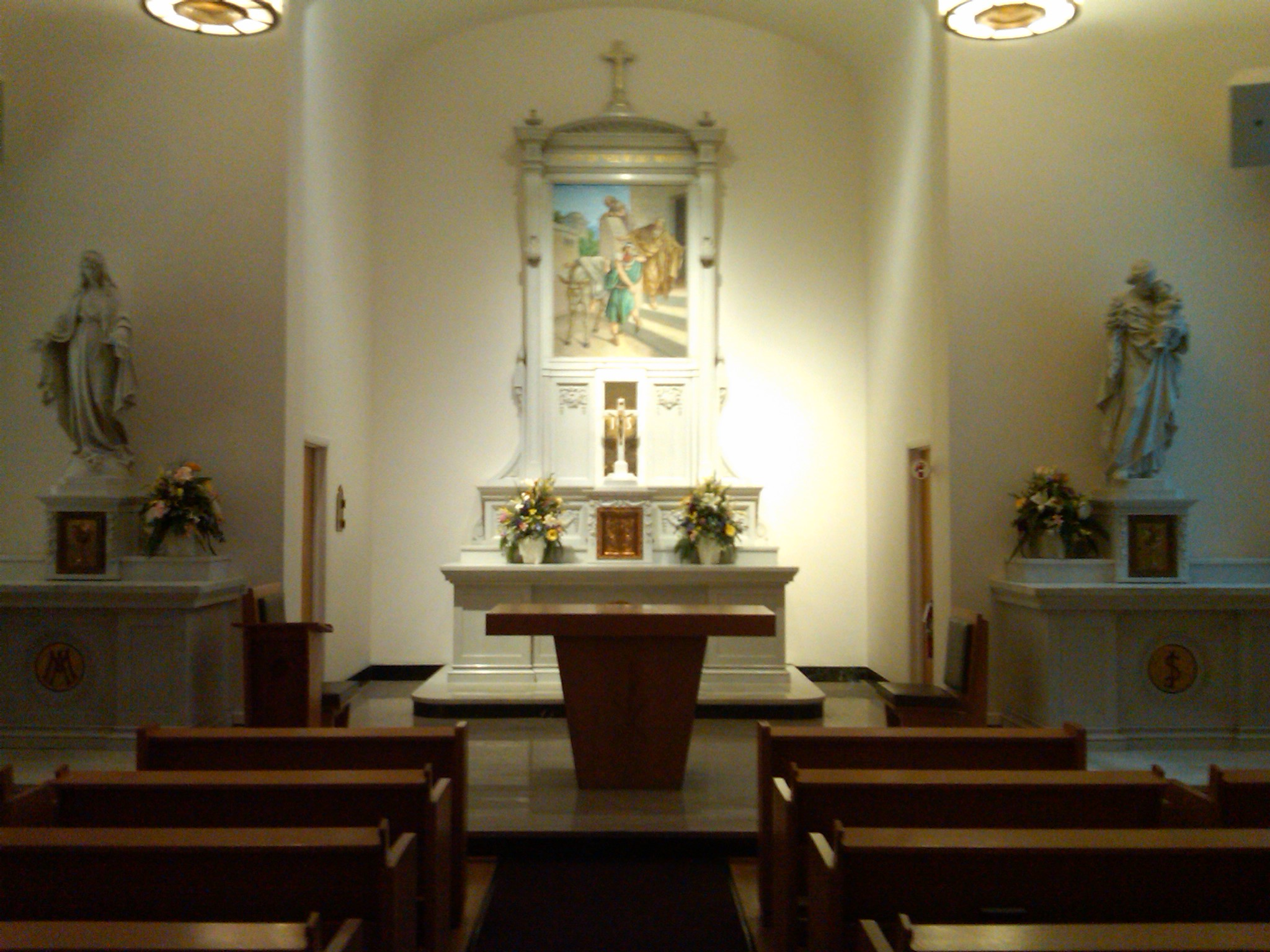
Before the 1960s, some bye-altars in Catholic churches also housed a tabernacle, in addition to that of the high altar.

The same Instruction lays down that:

314. In accordance with the structure of each church and legitimate local customs, the Most Blessed Sacrament should be reserved in a tabernacle in a part of the church that is truly noble, prominent, readily visible, beautifully decorated, and suitable for prayer.

The one tabernacle should be immovable, be made of solid and inviolable material that is not transparent, and be locked in such a way that the danger of profanation is prevented to the greatest extent possible. Moreover, it is appropriate that, before it is put into liturgical use, it be blessed according to the rite described in the Roman Ritual.

315. It is more in keeping with the meaning of the sign that the tabernacle in which the Most Holy Eucharist is reserved not be on an altar on which Mass is celebrated. Consequently, it is preferable that the tabernacle be located, according to the judgment of the Diocesan Bishop,

a. either in the sanctuary, apart from the altar of celebration, in a form and place more appropriate, not excluding on an old altar no longer used for celebration;

b. or even in some chapel suitable for the faithful's private adoration and prayer and which is organically connected to the church and readily visible to the Christian faithful.

316. In accordance with traditional custom, near the tabernacle a special lamp, fuelled by oil or wax, should be kept alight to indicate and honour the presence of Christ.

Tabernacles have generally been made of metal (such as bronze or brass), or sometimes of heavy wood. They are traditionally lined in white (red in the Ambrosian Rite) cloth (often silk), and are always securely lockable and affixed or bolted to a support structure. Some tabernacles are veiled when the Eucharist is present in them. These veils are often made of a cloth in the liturgical colour of the day or season, thus matching the priest's vestments.

==== Communion for the sick – Catholic Rite ====
There is no separate place for consecrated hosts to be distributed at Mass and those used for the homebound and sick. All consecrated hosts are kept in the ciborium inside the tabernacle. When bringing Communion to the homebound or sick, a small to medium-sized receptacle called a pyx is used by lay ministers, deacons and priests. Most are made from pewter with designs ranging from plain to very ornate and come in varying sizes, depending upon how many consecrated hosts one will need. The pyx is usually carried in a protective case made out of leather called a burse. Most burses have a long, string-like strap that can be worn around the neck.

Catholics only administer the consecrated hosts outside of the church. Priests have both a home Mass kit and a "sick call" kit. These come in carrying cases with a handle and vary in size, depending upon what is needed. A sick call kit comes with a small vial filled with the Oil of the Sick for administering the Sacrament of the Sick along with the pyx for administering Communion, crucifix, prayer book, perhaps a vestment called a "stole" for administering the Sacrament of Reconciliation (Confession) and any other items deemed essential by the priest. The anointing of the sick and confession are the two Sacraments of Healing in the Catholic Church.

Per the Church's teaching, it is inappropriate for a person to take the consecrated hosts into the home with them. After all sick calls have been made, the consecrated hosts are to be returned to the ciborium located inside the tabernacle.

=== Eastern Catholic and Orthodox churches ===
==== Reserved sacrament ====
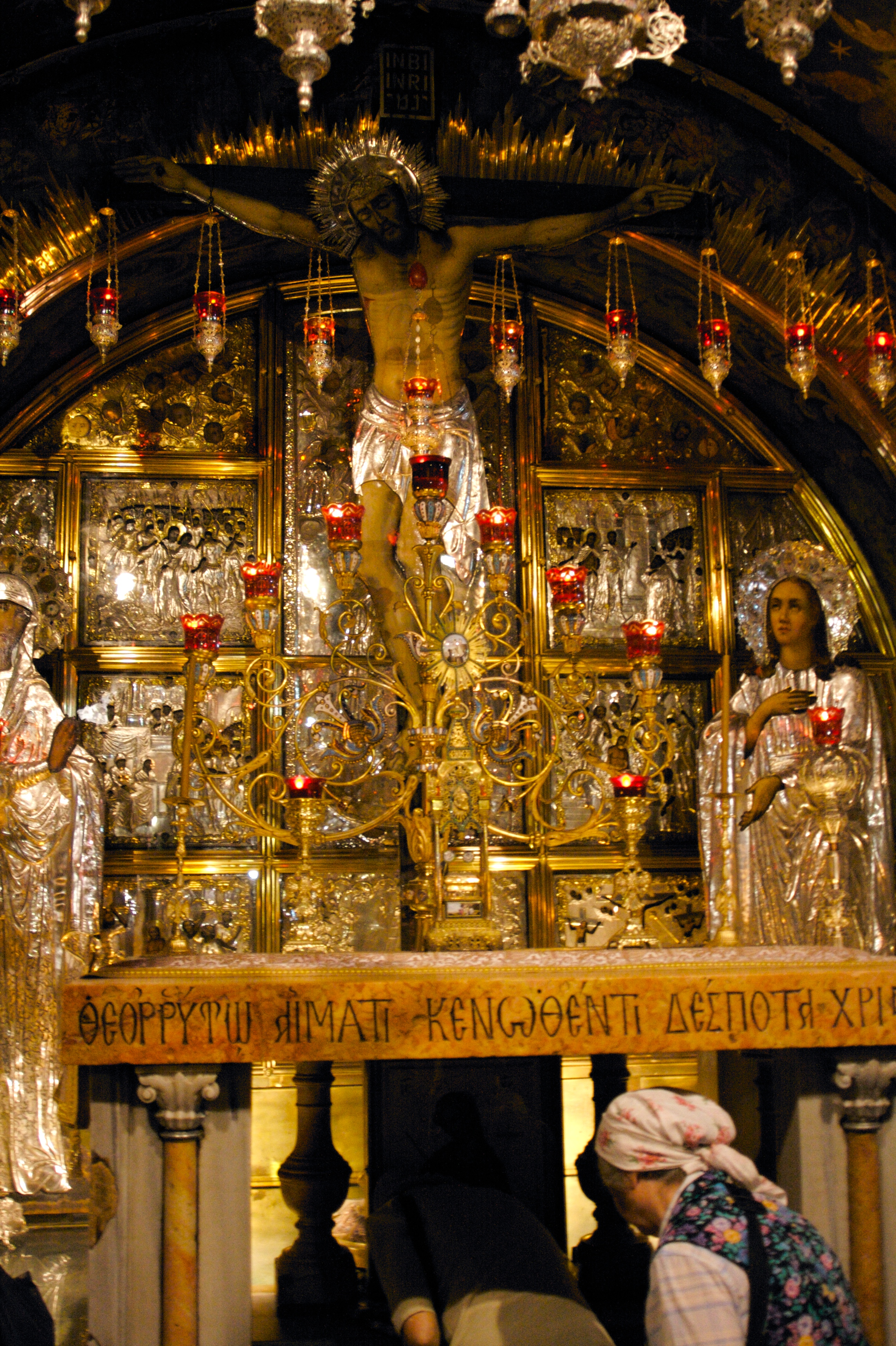
The altar at Golgotha in the Church of the Holy Sepulchre, Jerusalem. In the centre is an Orthodox tabernacle.

In the Eastern Orthodox Church, the Holy Mysteries (reserved sacrament) are kept in a tabernacle (Russian: Дарохрани́тельница, romanized: Darokhranítielnitsa, Ancient Greek: αρτοφοριον, artophorion) or ark (Church Slavonic: ковчег, kovchég) on the altar at all times. The tabernacle is normally made of gold, silver, or wood and elaborately decorated. It is often shaped like a miniature church building, and usually has a cross on top of it. It may be opened using small doors, or a drawer that is pulled out. Some churches keep the tabernacle under a glass dome to protect it and the Holy Mysteries within from dust and changes in humidity.

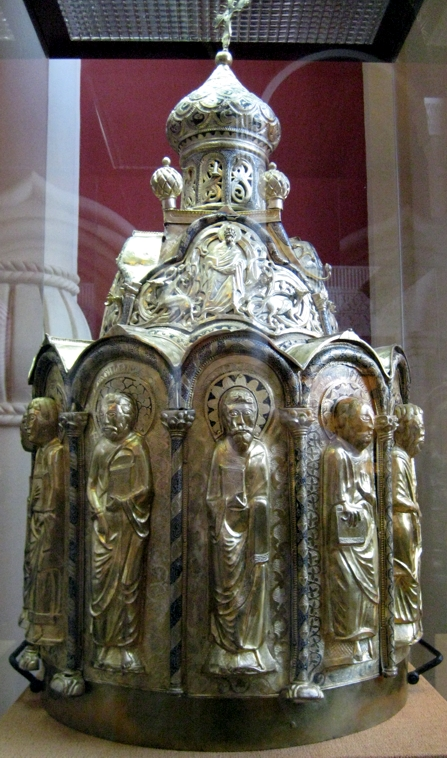
The ark or church tabernacle for a Russian Orthodox church (Dormition Cathedral in the Moscow Kremlin)

The Orthodox do not observe Eucharistic adoration as a devotion separate from the reception of Holy Communion. However, the real presence of the body and blood of Christ requires the Holy Mysteries to be respected. The clergy must be vested whenever they handle the tabernacle. During the Liturgy of the Presanctified Gifts (wherein Communion is received from the reserved Sacrament), when the consecrated Holy Mysteries are brought out during the Great Entrance, everyone makes a full prostration—even the chanters stop singing and prostrate themselves while the entrance is made in silence.

When Orthodox Christians receive Holy Communion, they always receive both the body and the blood of Christ. This includes Communion taken to the sick. Therefore, both are reserved in the tabernacle. Every year on Holy Thursday, the reserved Mysteries are renewed. The priest will cut an extra Lamb (host) for that liturgy and after the consecration, just before the clergy receive communion, the priest will take the extra host and carefully pour a little of the blood of Christ over it. This host will then be cut into very small portions, allowed to dry thoroughly and placed in the tabernacle. The deacon (or priest, if there is no deacon) will consume whatever remains of the previous year's reserved sacrament when he performs the ablutions.

Typically, a sanctuary lamp is kept burning in the Holy Place (Sanctuary) when the Mysteries are reserved. This may be a separate lamp hanging from the ceiling, or it may be the top lamp of the seven-branch candlestick which sits either on top of the Holy Table or behind it.

==== Communion for the sick – Orthodox and Eastern Rite ====
The receptacle for taking communion to the sick is also called a pyx. However, it is quite different from those used by Catholics, Anglicans and Lutherans. The pyx used by Western Rite Christians is a flat, circular container made to hold only consecrated hosts. The pyxides used in the Orthodox and Eastern Rites are designed for much more, and they, too, vary in size and designs may differ. They also may have a metal case with a chain attached so it can be hung around the neck. Inside the case are several compartments. One compartment contains a small box with a tightly fitting lid into which some of the reserved Holy Mysteries will be placed. There is also a place for a very small chalice, just enough to hold a small amount of wine and a particle of the reserved Mysteries. There will be a small bottle to hold ordinary wine (not consecrated) which is used to soften the particle before it is consumed, and a small pair of tweezers with which the priest removes a particle of the Mysteries from the box to place it in the chalice without touching it, and finally, a small communion spoon with which to administer Holy Communion. This sick call kit is normally kept on the Holy Table, or sometimes on the Table of Oblation.

Rather than using a kit like the one described above, a priest may use a small chalice with a tight-fitting lid. He pours a little wine into the chalice, places a particle of the reserved Mysteries in the wine, and attaches the lid. He will take the chalice and a communion spoon to administer Holy Communion to the sick.

==== Presanctified gifts ====
A smaller tabernacle sometimes referred to as a pyx, is used during Great Lent. It may be a rectangular, gold-plated box, often with a cross on top, and with a hinged lid. On Sundays during Great Lent, the priest will consecrate extra hosts (in the same manner as on Holy Thursday), for use during the Presanctified Liturgy. These hosts will be kept in the pyx on the Holy Table, or sometimes on the Prothesis (Table of Oblation).

=== Evangelical-Lutheran churches ===
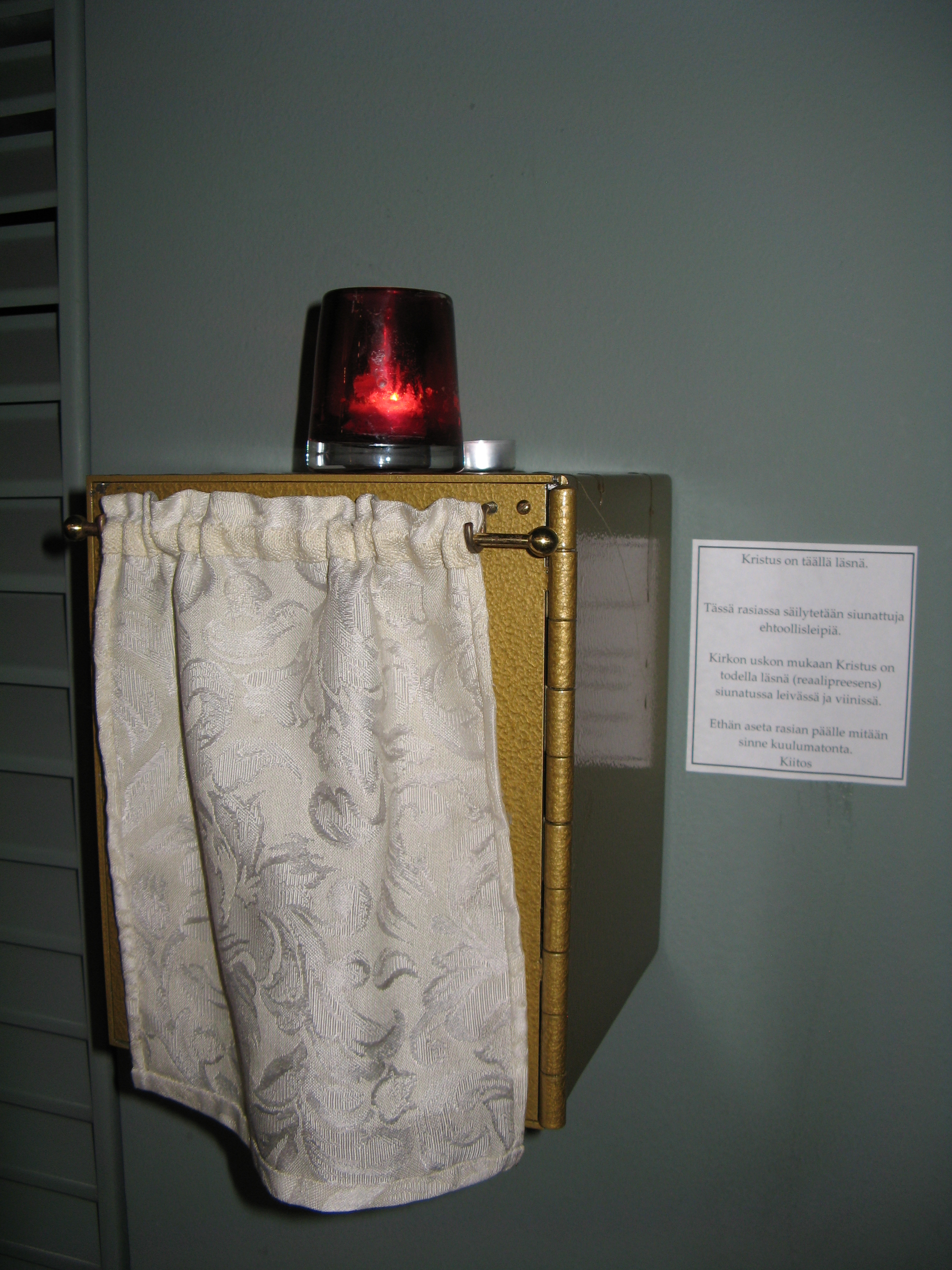
A tabernacle at Mikael Agricola Lutheran Church in Helsinki, juxtaposed with a chancel lamp and note about the real presence

Reservation of the blessed sacrament is permitted in the Lutheran churches, although generally not for the purposes of Eucharistic adoration. In Lutheran parishes that practice sacramental reservation, a chancel lamp is kept near the tabernacle or aumbry.

The now-defunct Evangelical Catholic Church, a Lutheran denomination of Evangelical Catholic, taught:

The Evangelical Catholic Church, together with the entire Church Catholic, affirms that there is a proper use of the Reservation of The Holy Sacrament when given to the sick, the dying, or as an indication of intercommunion. Its use at these times is, in fact, a most salutary testimony to the unity of The Body of Christ. She affirms the appropriateness of Eucharistic devotions within the celebration of The Divine Liturgy and She does not deny private devotions concerning the Reserved Sacrament. ... This Mystery of The Holy Eucharist becomes a reality by the Word of God, hallowed by the invocation of The Holy Spirit, and perfected by the presence of the thing signified (i.e., the Body and Blood of Jesus). This necessarily precedes its use, as Dr Luther testifies. Before Its use after the consecration within the Mass, in Its use, and after Its use, and what is reserved in the Tabernacles for the communing of those who are sick or about to die, It is in all respects the true Body and Blood of Our Lord Jesus Christ. "In, with, and under" the form of Bread and Wine, the Faithful truly receive The Sacred Body and Most Precious Blood of Jesus our God and Redeemer!

— Vide: WA, Tischreden, 5, 55.

=== Anglican and Episcopal churches ===
Only some Anglican parishes of Anglo-Catholic churchmanship use tabernacles, either fixed on the altar, placed behind or above it or off to one side. As in Catholic churches, the presence of the reserved sacrament is indicated by a "presence lamp" – an oil or wax-based flame in a clear glass vessel placed close to the tabernacle. Normally, only ciboria and Blessed Sacrament are placed in the tabernacle, although it is not uncommon for the wine or consecrated oils to be placed there as well. When the tabernacle is vacant, it is common practice to leave it open so that the faithful will not inadvertently perform an act of devotion (such as bowing or genuflecting). Tabernacles are customarily lined with, if not constructed from, cedar wood, whose aromatic qualities discourage insect life.

E. J. Bicknell in A Theological Introduction to the Thirty-Nine Articles writes that "According to the first Prayer-Book of Edward VI the sick might be communicated with the reserved sacrament on the same day as a celebration in church." Article XXVIII — Of the Lord's Supper in Anglicanism's 39 Articles and Article XVIII — Of the Lord's Supper in Methodism's Articles of Religion state that "The Sacrament of the Lord's Supper was not by Christ's ordinance reserved, carried about, lifted up, or worshipped." The Rev. Jonathan A. Michigan, founder of The Conciliar Anglican writes that this Article "does not explicitly ban these practices but does add a note of caution about them by pointing to the fact that none of them is biblical." As such, the reserved sacrament was used by Anglican priests who held these views to administer communion to persons unable to attend church through illness. However, in 1885 the upper house of Convocation ruled against this practice, declaring "the practice of reservation is contrary to the wise and carefully revised Order of the Church of England".

Among those Anglicans who identify as "Anglo-Catholics," the Protestant Reformation is often considered one episode in church history that no longer defines their faith as Anglicans. After the Oxford Movement, reservation became commonplace in large parts of the Anglican Communion, and some parishes also perform services of solemn benediction and/or other forms of Eucharistic adoration.

The Anglo-Catholic manual of rites and ceremonies Ritual Notes described tabernacles as generally made of wood. They could however, be made of gold, silver or even iron (if the iron is enclosed in gilt-wood, wrought metal or carved stone). If the material is metal there should be an inner lining of poplar or cedar wood which also has a lining of white silk or cloth of gold or silver. The tabernacle should be securely fixed to the altar or gradine (shelf), but away from the wall so that the conopaeum (a veil used to cover it when it contains the blessed sacrament) can completely surround it. The veil may be white or varying in liturgical colour. There may be a second tabernacle but not more than one can be in use at the same time. A lamp should remain lit nearby when the tabernacle is in use.

== Gallery ==
The tabernacle of Vadstena Abbey Church (Evangelical-Lutheran) in Vättern, Sweden

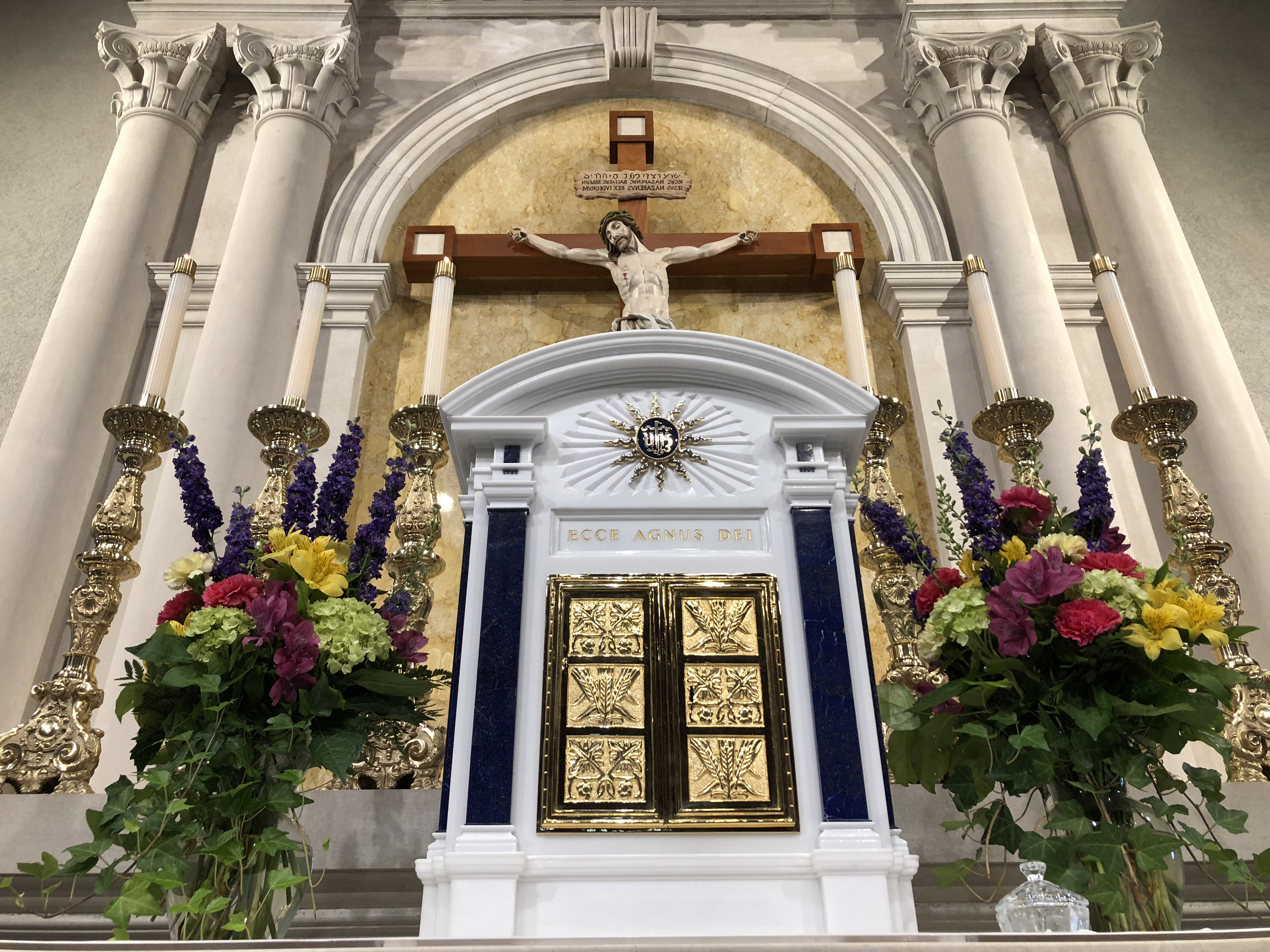
Tabernacle at St. Catherine of Siena Church, in Trumbull, Connecticut

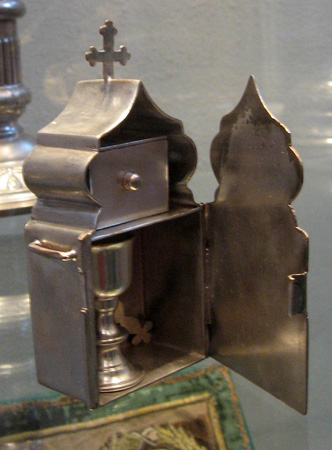
Small tabernacle for the communion of the sick in an Eastern Orthodox church. At the top is a box for the Reserved Mysteries (Reserved Sacrament); at the bottom is a small chalice, and in the back is a tiny communion spoon with a cross on the handle (Kiev-Pecherski Lavra).

== See also ==
- First Thursdays Devotion
- Torah ark
- Tabernacle (Methodist)
- Tabernacle (LDS Church)
