= Asterisk (liturgy) =

Liturgical object covering the diskos in Byzantine liturgy

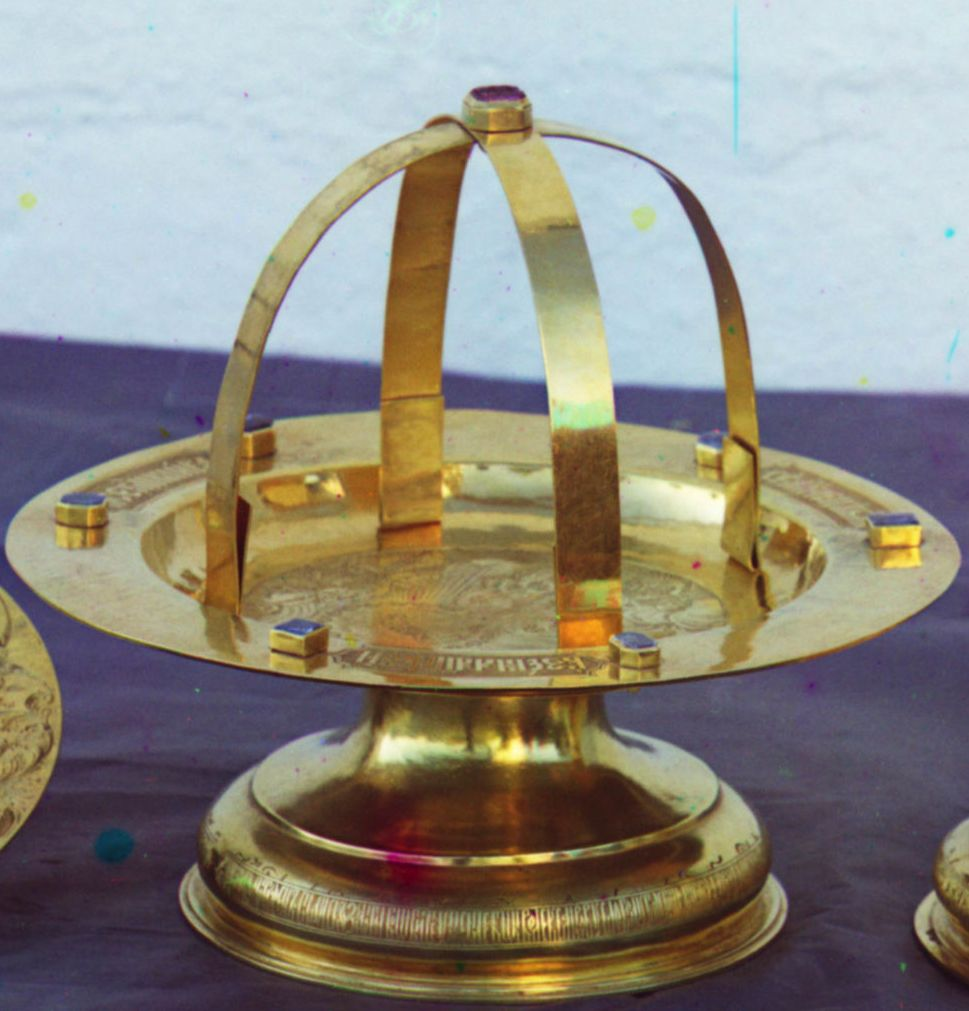
An asterisk resting atop the diskos.

The Asterisk (Greek: Ἀστερίσκον, ἀστερίσκος, romanized: Asterískon, asterískos; Slavonic: Звездица, Zvezdítsa), or Star-cover (from the Greek αστήρ, astêr, meaning star), is one of the holy vessels used in the Divine Liturgy of the Eastern Orthodox, Oriental Orthodox and Eastern Catholic Churches. The asterisk symbolizes the Star of Bethlehem. Historically, it was also used in some parts of the Roman Catholic Church.

== Form ==
An asterisk is a small, folding metal covering which keeps the veil and Aër (larger veil) from disturbing the particles of bread on the diskos (paten).

The asterisk is made of two strips of metal laid one on top of the other and joined in the center by a brad or screw. When the two pieces are turned perpendicular to each other it forms a cross. The ends of the metal pieces are bent down so that it makes a standing frame. Sometimes, in Greek Catholic usage, a small star will be suspended from the asterisk where the two strips of metal are joined. Among Orthodox, however, the asterisk itself is considered to be the star, so no addition to it is deemed necessary.

As the asterisk is one of the sacred vessels, it is usually kept on the Prothesis (Table of Oblation), where the bread and wine are prepared for the Eucharist, and no one except the priest or deacon should touch it. Often when a chalice and diskos are made, an Asterisk, and a liturgical spoon, and spear will be made to match them.

== Use ==
During the Liturgy of Preparation, after the priest has prepared the bread and the wine, he will cense the asterisk by holding it over the open censer. He then places it on the diskos as he says the words, And a star came and stood over the place where the young child was (Cf. Matthew 2:9).

During a Hierarchical Liturgy (i.e., one at which a bishop presides), just before the Great Entrance, the veils and asterisk will be removed and the bishop will make commemorations for the living and the dead, after which he will replace the asterisk and veils.

After the Sursum Corda, the deacon will lift the asterisk up from the diskos, and strike the diskos with it on four sides, making the sign of the cross, while the priest raises his hands and says, "Singing the triumphant song, shouting, crying aloud, and saying:" at which the choir begins the Sanctus. The deacon kisses the asterisk, folds it, and lays it aside on the Antimension, as the priest begins the Prayer of the Anaphora.

After the Communion of the Faithful, the veils, spear, spoon, and asterisk are placed on the diskos. The priest hands them to the deacon, who carries them back to the Prothesis.

== Coptic Use ==
In the Coptic Orthodox and Coptic Catholic Churches, the asterisk "consists of two silver arched bands, held by a screw, crossed over each other into the shape of a cross, usually surmounted by a small cross." In Arabic it is referred to as the Dome and is believed to represent both Christ's tomb and the cave in which he was born. Either the asterisk itself or the cross above it also symbolises the Star of Bethlehem. For this reason, the whole item is sometimes simply called the Star.

== Roman Rite ==
In the Roman Rite of the Catholic Church, a special twelve-ray asterisk was traditionally used in Papal Masses to cover the host on the paten when it was brought to the Pope at his throne for Communion. Unlike an Eastern asterisk with four rays, a Papal asterisk has twelve rays, each inscribed with the name of an Apostle. This practice has been documented in historical liturgical texts, and its use revived by Pope Benedict XVI. Pope Francis refrained from using the special form of asterisk at his pontifical Masses. The item was reintroduced once again by Pope Leo XIV during the Mass of his papal inauguration in 2025 and keeps using it when serving Mass on the outdoor altar likely to protect the Host from the wind.
