= Prothesis =

Prothesis may refer to:

- Liturgy of Preparation, also known as Prothesis
- Prothesis (altar)
- Prothesis (linguistics)
- A form of the custom of lying in repose in Ancient Greece; see Ancient Greek funeral and burial practices

== See also ==
- Prosthesis (disambiguation)
