= Aër =

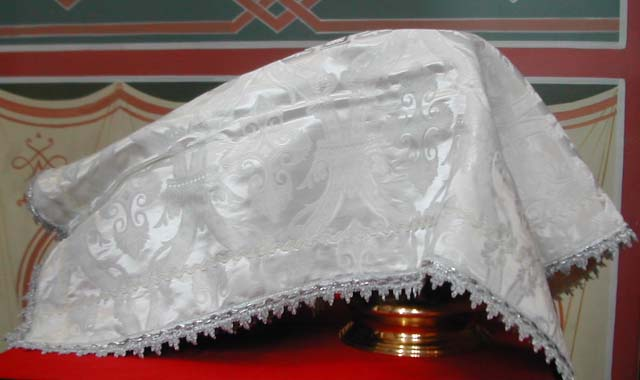
Aër covering a Chalice and Diskos on the Prothesis

The Aër (Ancient Greek: Ἀήρ, lit. 'air'; Modern Greek: Αέρας; Slavonic: Воздýхъ, Vozdúkh) is the largest and outermost of the veils covering the Chalice and Diskos (paten) in the Eastern Orthodox Church and the Eastern Catholic Churches which follow the Byzantine Rite. It is rectangular in shape and corresponds to the veil used to cover the chalice and paten in the Latin liturgical rites, but is larger. It is often made of the same material and color as the vestments of the officiating priest, and often has a fringe going all the way around its edge. Tassels may also be sewn at each of the corners.

It takes its name either from the lightness of the material of which it is made, or from the fact that during the Nicene Creed in the Divine Liturgy, the priest holds it high in the air and waves it slowly over the Chalice and Diskos. Its original use was to cover the Chalice and prevent anything from falling into it before the consecration. It symbolizes the swaddling clothes with which Christ was wrapped at his Nativity, and also the grave clothes in which he was wrapped at his burial (both themes are found in the text of the Liturgy of Preparation).

The Aër is first mentioned by name in an explanation of the Divine Liturgy by a writer of the sixth century, and is also alluded to as "the so-called Aër" in the Acts of the Council of Constantinople.

== Divine Liturgy ==
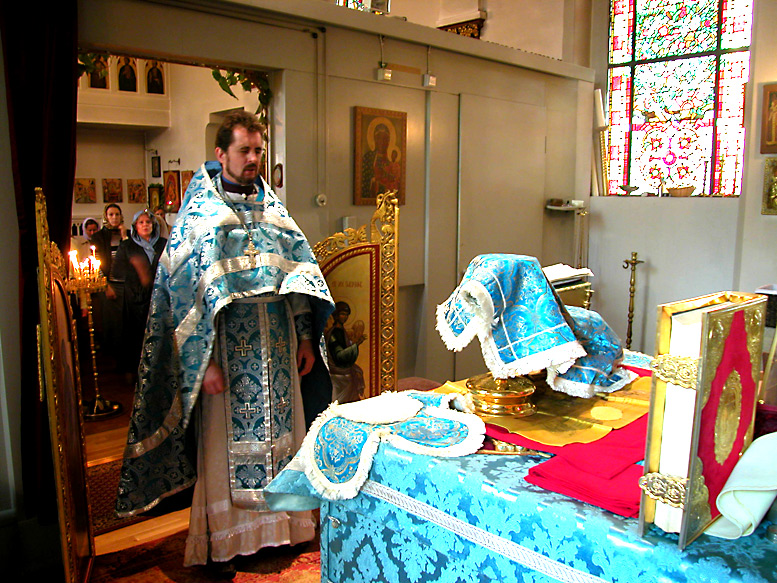
Priest standing at the Holy Table (altar) after the Great Entrance. The Aër has been laid over the chalice and diskos.

At the Divine Liturgy, during the Liturgy of Preparation, when the Aër is to be placed over the Gifts (the Bread and Wine for the Eucharist), it is first wrapped around the censer and then laid over the Chalice and Diskos, so that the front edge of the Aër just touches the surface of the table. When not covering the Gifts, the Aër is folded (usually folded 3 x 3, so that when it is laid out flat the creases will form a cross). The Aër normally has a cross embroidered in its exact center, so that when it is folded the cross is visible.

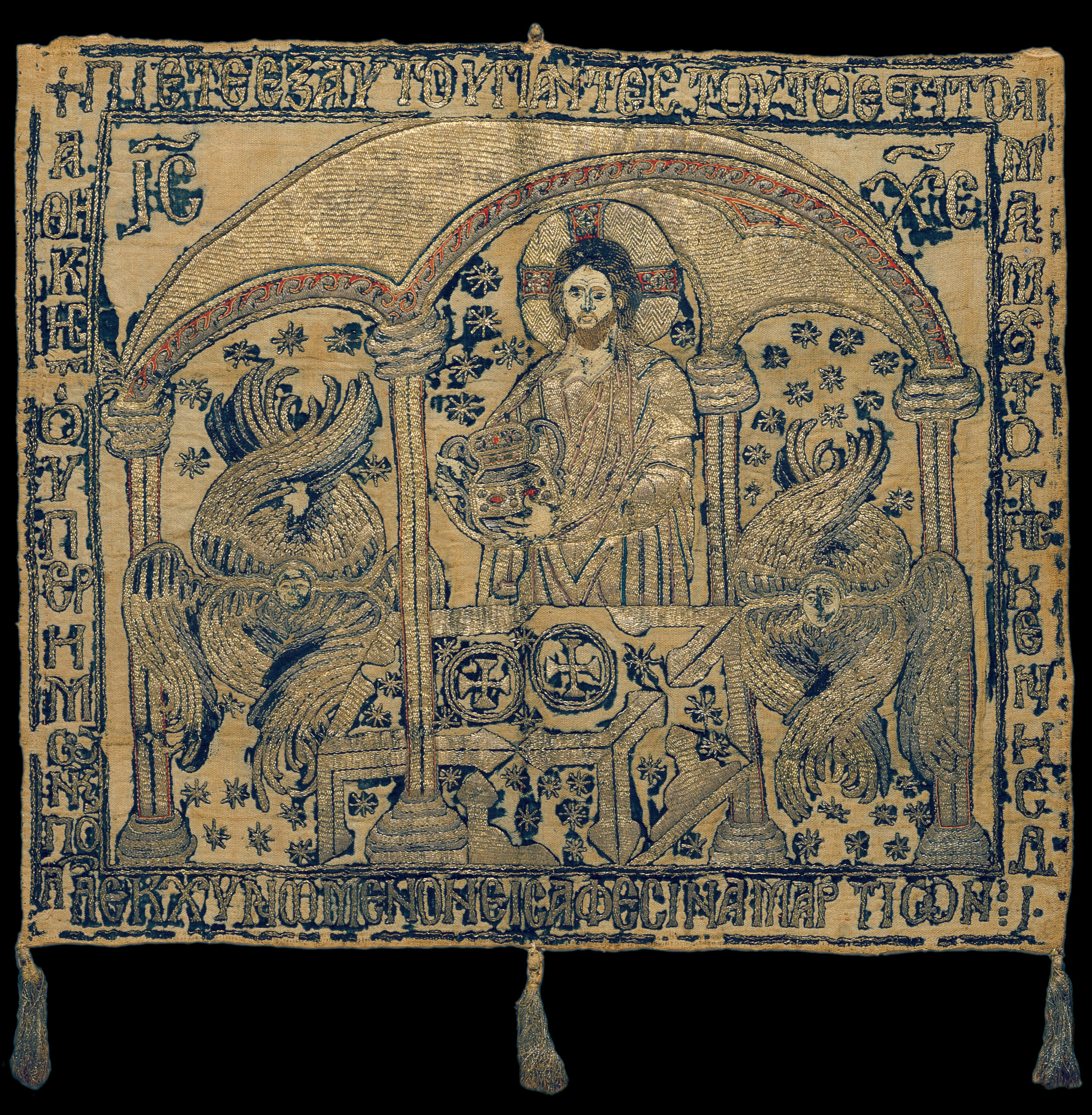
Gold-thread embroidered Aer (13th century)

At the Great Entrance, when the sacred vessels are brought in procession to the Holy Table (altar), the priest will place the Aër over the deacon's left shoulder before he hands him the Diskos (the priest himself will carry the Chalice). For this reason, the Aër will often have ribbons sewn onto it, so it can be tied securely in place. If there is no deacon serving, the priest will place the Aër around his own shoulders like a cape, which will leave his hands free to take both the Diskos and the Chalice.

Just before the chanting of the Symbol of the Faith (Nicene Creed), the Priest will kiss the Diskos and Chalice (by kissing the Aër in the place where it touches each vessel) and the front edge of the Holy Table. During the Creed, the priest will hold the Aër above the Gifts and wave it slowly, indicating the activity of the Holy Spirit. When a bishop is serving the Liturgy, the concelebrating priests will hold the Aër during the Creed as the bishop kneels (or bows his head) underneath it. After the Creed, the Aër is folded and placed on the Holy Table. In some practices, the priest will turn and bless the people with the Aër during the Sursum corda.

Following Communion, the Aër is placed, still folded, on the Diskos, together with the Spear, Spoon and Asterisk and little veils, and all are taken back to the Prothesis by the deacon.

== Other uses ==
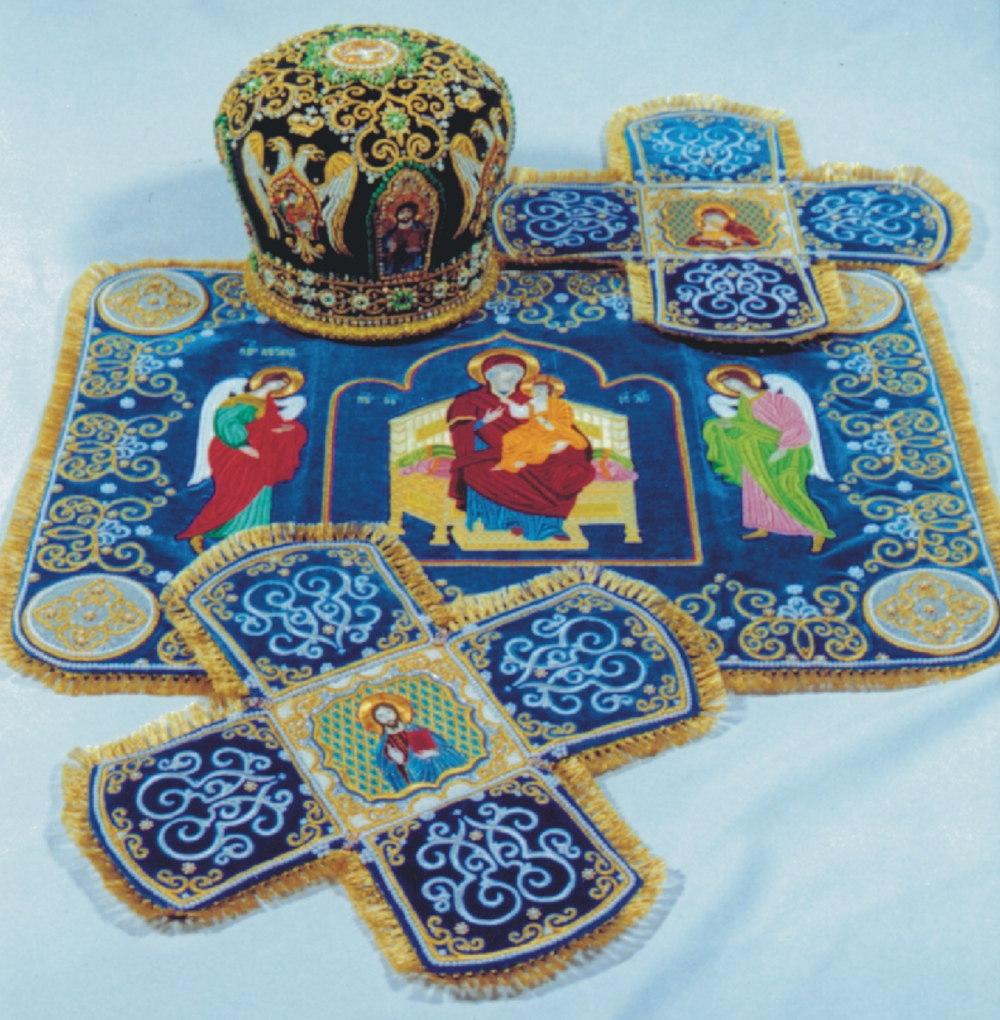
Finely embroidered Aër and smaller cross-shaped veils for the Chalice and Diskos (a mitre stands at the upper left)

During a Liturgy of Presanctified Gifts, the priest or deacon wears the Aër on his left shoulder for the Great Entrance.

Whenever a bishop first arrives at a church or monastery, he will be greeted by the senior priest holding a tray covered by an Aër, on which is placed a blessing cross for him to kiss.

At the Ordination of a priest, when it is time for the Great Entrance, the Bishop will drape the Aër over the candidate's head and shoulders, and in this manner he will carry it in the procession. The candidate will not enter the Sanctuary with the rest of the clergy, but will remain standing at the Holy Doors. The Bishop will remove the Aër from his head and place it over the Gifts and cense them, after which the Ordination takes place.

During Feasts of the Cross a cross is laid on a tray covered by an Aër and decorated with basil leaves and flowers. This is carried by the priest from the Prothesis to the Holy Table, where it will remain until the Great Doxology near the end of Matins. At that point the priest will take it in procession to the center of the church where all the faithful will come forward to venerate the cross.

At the death of a priest or bishop, when his body is vested for burial, his face will be covered with an Aër to show his closeness to the Sacred Mysteries.

In some of the monasteries on the Holy Mountain, when the Ecclesiarch (Sacristan) and Paraecclesiarch (his assistant) cense, each will wear an Aër on his left shoulder.

== See also ==
- Liturgical veils
