= Spoon (liturgy) =

Liturgical object for giving Communion to the laity in Eastern Christian rites

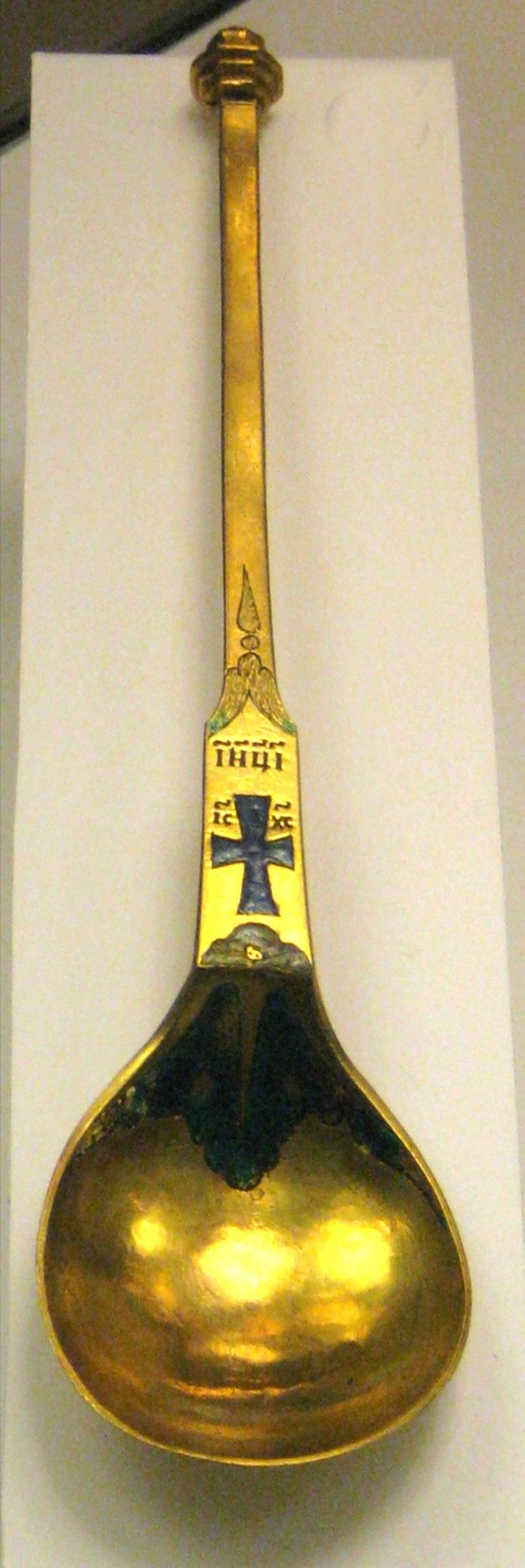
Gold communion spoon, Ukraine, late 17th or early 18th century (State Historical Museum, Moscow).

The Spoon (Greek: Κοχλιάριον, Kochliárion; Slavonic: Лжица, Lzhítza) is a liturgical implement used to distribute Holy Communion to the laity during the Divine Liturgy in some Eastern Christian rites.

It is also called a cochlear, Latin for "spoon". In Western Christianity (within traditions such as Anglicanism, Lutheranism, and Methodism) a perforated spoon is used to remove any foreign particulate matter that falls into the wine. It is one of the items, in Western Christian Churches, that lies on the credence table.

== Purpose ==
In the Early Church everyone, clergy and laity alike, received Holy Communion in the same manner: receiving the consecrated Body of Christ (in the form of bread) in their hands and then placing it in their own mouth, and sipping directly from the chalice. In time, concern over the danger of crumbs being accidentally dropped on the floor or some of the consecrated Blood of Christ (in the form of wine) being spilt, led to the use of tongs, with which the elements were mingled together and placed carefully into the mouths of the communicants. By the 9th century, the Church began to use the Communion spoon for the same practical reasons, and it is this practice that remains in place today (though the clergy still receive in the ancient manner as they stand at the Holy Table).

== Usage ==
=== Byzantine Rite ===
In the Byzantine Rite, when it comes time for the Communion of the faithful, the Lamb (Host) is cut into smaller portions with the Spear and placed in the Chalice, and thus distributed to the faithful using the Spoon. In this way, the faithful receive both the Body and Blood of Christ, without taking the Sacrament into their hands. At the end of the Liturgy, the Deacon will use the Spoon to consume the remaining Gifts (Body and Blood of Christ), and then ablute the Spoon, Spear and Chalice using wine and hot water (the Diskos (Paten) is usually abluted only with hot water).

Since the Spoon is one of the Sacred Vessels it is usually kept on the Table of Oblation (Prothesis), where the bread and wine are prepared for the Eucharist. Often when a Chalice and Diskos are made, an Asterisk, Spoon, and Spear will be made to match them. Because it touches the Body and Blood of Christ, the liturgical spoon should be made of gold, or at least be gold plated.

The Spoon is also used to prepare the Presanctified Gifts at the Sunday Liturgies during Great Lent, and the Reserved Mysteries on Great Thursday of Holy Week. The priest will take up the Lamb in his left hand and hold it over the Chalice. With the Spoon in his right hand, he will pour some of the Blood of Christ onto the underside of the Lamb, where the cross had been cut with the Spear during the Proskomedie.

The Spoon, being a sanctified object, may not be used for any purpose other than the liturgical uses for which it is appointed, and no one of lower rank than a deacon should touch it.

=== Alexandrian Rite ===
After the priest has placed a piece of the consecrated loaf in the communicant's mouth by hand, the deacon gives the communicant the consecrated wine with the Spoon.

=== Maronite Rite ===
The Maronite Catholic Church stands as an exception, as the faithful are given Communion by dipping a part of the consecrated loaf into the chalice, usually held by a deacon, and His Body, intincted with His Blood, is then placed in the communicant's mouth by hand. The spoon is still often found as part of the ware of the altar, but is not normally used. This is also true for the Melkite Greek Catholic Church.
