= Spear (liturgy) =

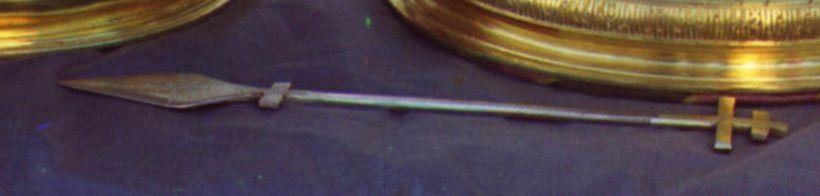
The liturgical spear, on the Table of Oblation.

The Spear (Greek: λόγχη, romanized: lónchē; Church Slavonic: Копіе́, romanized: Kopìé) or Lance is a liturgical implement used during the Divine Liturgy in the Byzantine Rite of the Eastern Orthodox Church and the Eastern Catholic Churches.

== Significance ==
The Spear symbolizes the lance of Longinus that was used at the time of Christ's death on the Cross to pierce his side, from which flowed blood and water (John 19:34). This event is traditionally interpreted as prefiguring the Sacred Mysteries (Sacraments) of the Eucharist and Baptism.

== Form ==
The Spear is one of the Sacred liturgical tools usually kept on the Table of Oblation (Prothesis), where the bread and wine are prepared for Holy Communion. Often when a Chalice and Diskos (Paten) are made, an Asterisk and a Spoon and Spear will be made to match them. The Spear is normally made of precious metal (or at least plated with silver and/or gold), has a point sharp enough to cut the bread, and will often have a cross at the end of the handle.

== Liturgical use ==
The Spear is used during the Liturgy of Preparation when the priest cuts the Lamb out of the Prosphoron (loaf of leavened bread) which will be consecrated to become the Body of Christ. The Spear is also used before Holy Communion to cut the Lamb into pieces for the clergy and faithful to commune from.

In the Euchologion there is also a special Prayer of the Spear which may be said by the priest when one is sick.

The Spear, being a sanctified object, may not be used for any purpose other than the liturgical uses for which it is appointed.
