= Prosthesis (disambiguation) =

Prosthesis is an artificial replacement of a missing part of the body.

Prosthesis may also refer to:

- Prosthesis (linguistics), an addition of a phoneme at the beginning of a word, for easier pronunciation
- Prosthetic group, a nonprotein component of a conjugated protein
- Prosthetic makeup or FX prosthesis, a prosthetic intended to radically alter appearance or provide special effects in film, television and stage
- Prosthetic Records, a record label
- Prosthesis, a gelechioid moth genus nowadays considered synonymous with Blastobasis

== See also ==
- Prothesis (disambiguation), often used synonymously with prosthesis
- Orthotics, devices which support or correct the function of a limb or the torso
