= Lamb (liturgy) =

Liturgical component in the Eastern Orthodox and Byzantine Catholic churches

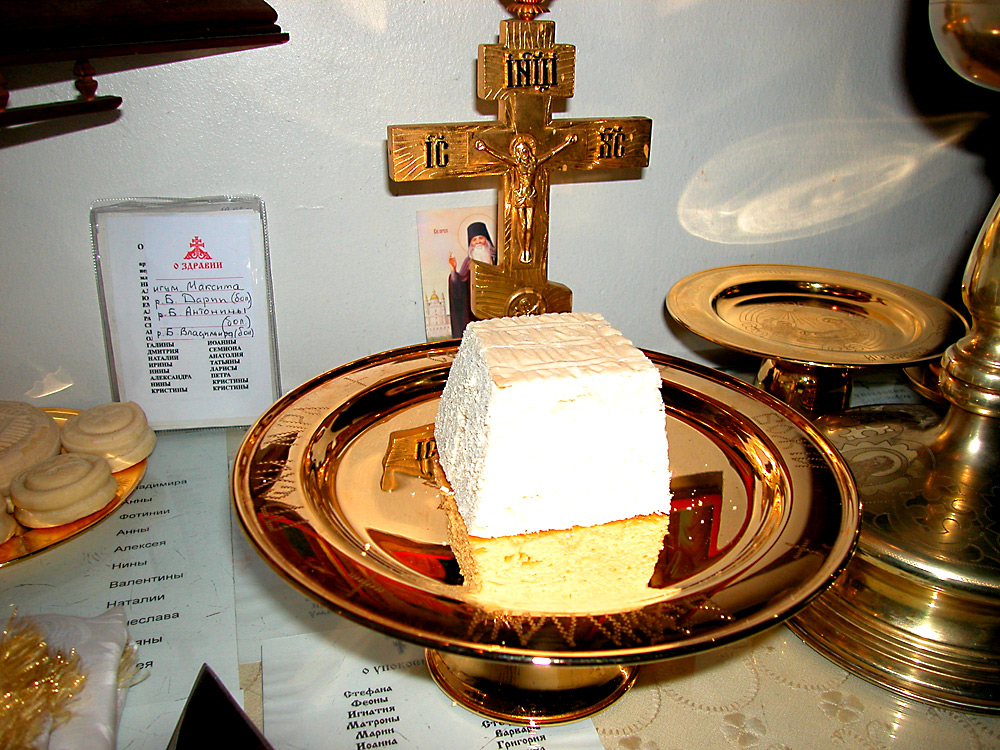
the Lamb placed on the diskos during the Proskomedie. To the left are other prosphora which will be used during the service.

The Lamb (Greek: ἀμνός, romanized: amnos; Church Slavonic: Агнецъ, romanized: agnets) is the square portion of bread cut from the prosphora in the Liturgy of Preparation at the Divine Liturgy in the Eastern Orthodox and Byzantine Catholic churches. The Lamb is cut from a specially prepared loaf of leavened bread and placed in the center of the diskos. The loaf, called a prosphoron, has had stamped in the top of its dough the seal of the Greek letters IC, XC, and NIKA, "Jesus Christ conquers", divided by a Greek cross, and the portion by the seal is cutout as the Lamb. The loaf must be made only from the finest flour, yeast, salt and water. It is formed in two layers to symbolize the hypostatic union.

== Liturgy of preparation ==
The priest cuts the Lamb from the prosphoron using a liturgical knife called a "spear", with a blade shaped like a spearpoint to recall the spear used at the crucifixion to pierce Jesus' side. Cutting along each edge, and removing the Lamb, he recites a phrase from Isaiah 53:7–8:

- on the right side: "He was led as a sheep to the slaughter."
- on the left side: "And as a spotless lamb before His shearers is dumb, so he opened not his mouth."
- at the top: "In his humiliation his judgement was taken away."
- at the bottom: "And who shall declare His generation?"
- as he removes the Lamb from the prosphoron: "For His life is taken up from the earth."

In (Acts 8:32–33) St. Philip interprets these as referring to the sacrifice of Christ on the Cross.

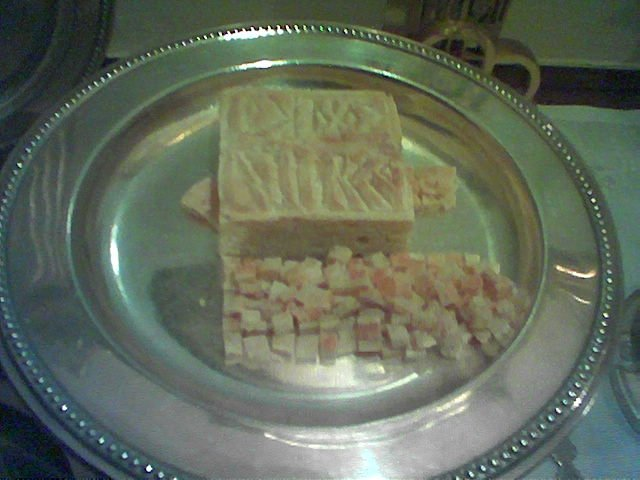
The Lamb with particles

He then places the Lamb face down on the seal, and cuts it cross-wise almost all the way through, leaving it connected as one piece by the seal. This will facilitate the fraction after the anaphora. As he makes these cuts, he says, "Sacrificed is the Lamb of God Who taketh away the sins of the world, for the life of the world, and the salvation thereof."

He then stands the Lamb upright again, and pierces it with the tip of the spear on its right (the priest's left) below the seal, saying, "One of the soldiers pierced His side with a spear, and straightway there came forth blood and water. And he that saw it bare witness, and his witness is true." (John 19:34–35)

There are other particles also cut from prosphora as part of the Liturgy of Preparation. These commemorate the Theotokos, nine ranks of saints, the living, and the departed. These smaller particles are arranged around the Lamb on the diskos. A metal frame, the asterisk or star-cover, is placed over the diskos to support the small veil with which it is covered. This veil remains in place until the diskos is set upon the altar. The priest will then cense the aër and place it over both the diskos and chalice, where it will remain until just prior to the Great Entrance, when the bread and wine are carried to the Holy Table for the consecration.

== Communion ==
At the anaphora only the Lamb is actually consecrated; the other particles are considered to remain only bread.

When it comes time for Communion, the priest will divide the Lamb into four portions, breaking it along the cuts in the underside made during the Liturgy of Preparation. The deacon will say, "Break, Master, the Holy Bread." And, as he breaks it, the priest says, "Broken and distributed is the Lamb of God; broken, but not disunited; ever eaten, yet never consumed; sanctifying all who partake thereof." He then puts the four portions of the Lamb on the rim of the diskos in the form of a cross. They remain in this arrangement only briefly.

The upper portion (that has IC on the seal) is placed whole in the Chalice to signify the oneness of Christ. The deacon says, "Fill, Master, the Holy Cup." As he places the particle in the Chalice, the priest says, "The fullness of the Holy Spirit."

The lower portion, (with XC on the seal) is cut into smaller particles with which the clergy are communicated.

The portions on the left and right (with NI and KA, respectively) are cut into much smaller particles. These are placed into the chalice and used to communicate the faithful.

== Presanctified liturgy ==
During Great Lent it is not permitted to celebrate the Divine Liturgy on weekdays and, therefore, on certain weekdays thereof and on the first three days of Holy Week, communion is given from Lambs consecrated on the previous Sunday at the Liturgy of the Presanctified Gifts.

== See also ==
- Body of Christ
- Lamb of God
- Host (Holy Communion)
- Prosphora
- Zeroa
