= Diaconicon =

Place for storing vestments

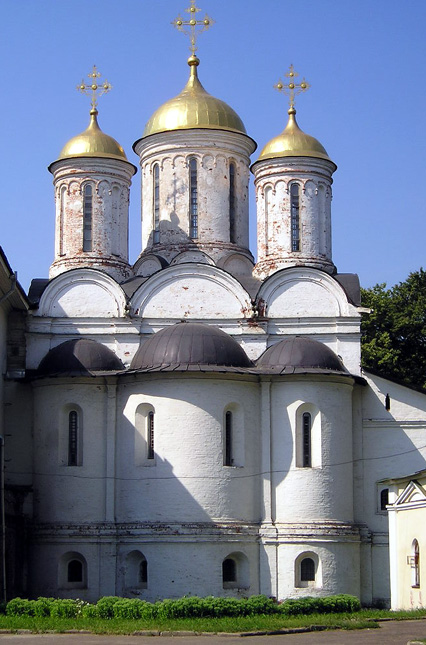
The triple apse of an Orthodox Church. The altar is in the larger central apse, the prothesis in the apse to the right, and the diaconicon in the one to the left.

The diaconicon (Greek: διακονικόν, romanized: diakonikon; Slavonic: diakonik) is, in Eastern Orthodox and Eastern Catholic Churches, the name given to a chamber on the south side of the central apse of the church, where the vestments, books, etc., that are used in the Divine Services of the church are kept (the sacred vessels are kept in the prothesis, which is on the north side of the sanctuary). Diaconicon and prothesis are collectively known as pastophoria.

The diaconicon contains the thalassidion (piscina), a sink that drains into an honorable place where liquids such as the water used to wash holy things may be poured, and where the clergy may wash their hands before serving the Divine Liturgy. The diaconicon will usually have cabinets or drawers where the vestments and church hangings (antependia) may be safely stored. Here will also be kept the reserved charcoal, and a place for heating the zeon (boiling water that is poured into the chalice before Holy Communion). Towels and other necessary items will be kept here also.

Only bishops or priests may sit in the sanctuary; however, deacons and altar servers may sit in the diaconicon when they are not needed for the service. Because the diaconicon is located behind the iconostasis it is considered to be a holy place, and only those who have a specific liturgical duty to perform should go in, and any regulations pertaining to entry into the sanctuary may apply here as well.

During the reign of Justin II (565–574), owing to a change in the liturgy, the diaconicon and prothesis came to be located in separate apses at the east end of the sanctuary. Before that time there was only one apse.

In the churches in central Syria of slightly earlier date, the diaconicon is rectangular, the side apses at Kalat-Seman having been added at a later date.

The word "diaconicon" can also refer to the liturgical book specifying the functions of the deacon.

== See also ==
- Altar
- Prothesis
- Sacristy
