= Prosphora =

Bread used in Eastern Orthodox rituals

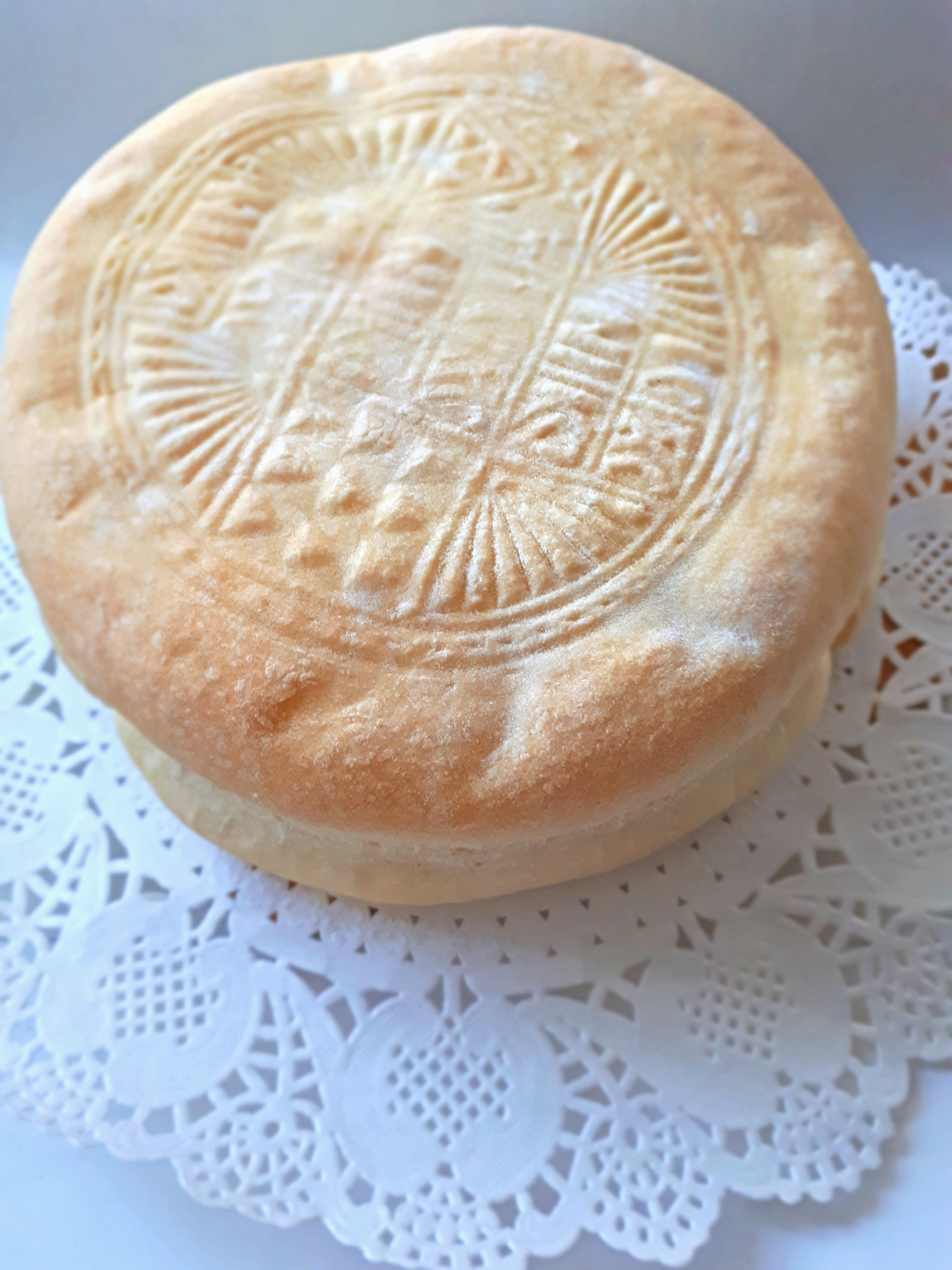
- Prosphora - leavened bread stamped with a special seal
- Type: Bread
- Main ingredients: Wheat flour (white), yeast, salt, water

A prosphora (Greek: προσφορά, offering, or in Demotic Greek πρόσφορον) is a small loaf of leavened bread used in Orthodox Christian, Eastern Lutheran and Greek Catholic (Byzantine) liturgies. The classical plural form is prosphorai (προσφοραί). The term originally meant any offering made to a temple, but in Orthodox Christianity, as well as Byzantine-rite Lutheranism and Catholicism, it has come to mean specifically the bread offered at the Eucharist during Divine Liturgy.

== Baking ==
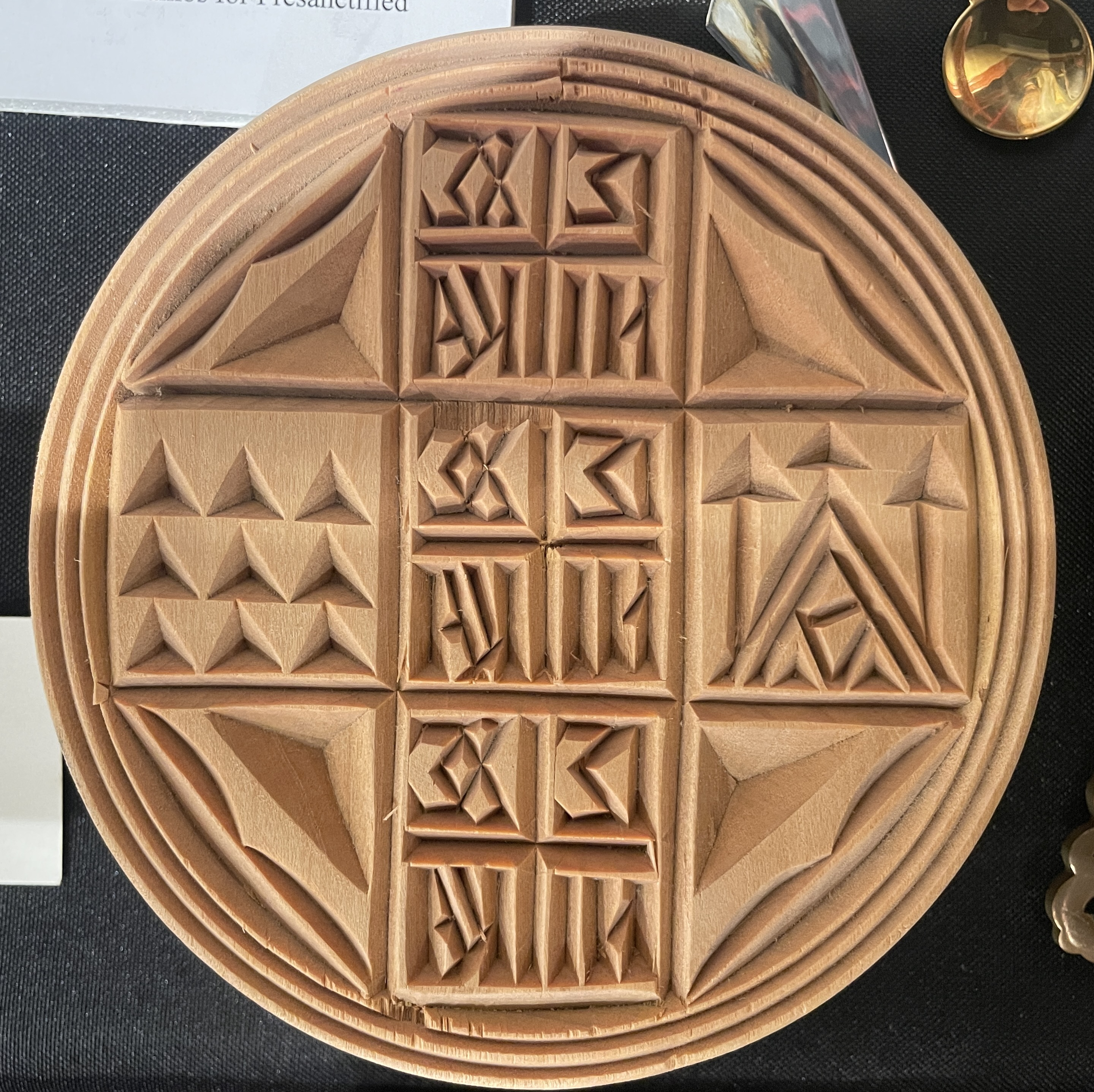
Greek-style prosphora seal, for one large loaf: in the center is the Lamb (symbol: IC XC NI KA Christogram), to the viewer's right is the Panagia (symbol: ΜΘ (Μήτηρ Θεοῦ)), to the left are the Nine Angelic Ranks (symbol: nine triangles), and on the top and bottom are extra Lambs for Presanctified (symbol: said Christogram). The positions of the Panagia and Nine Ranks will be reversed when the impression is made.

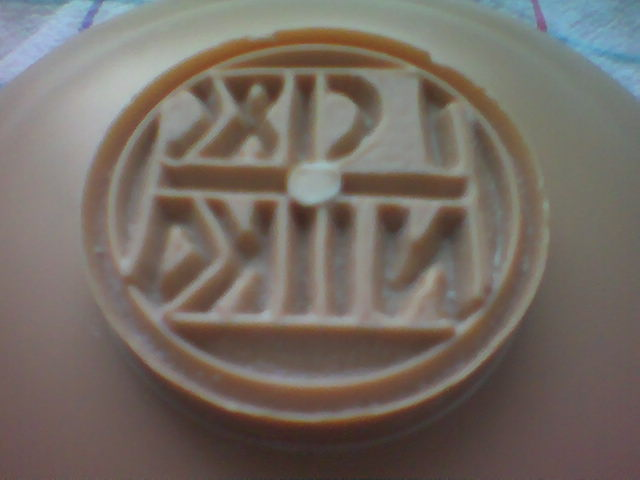
Russian-style prosphora seal, for five small identical loaves

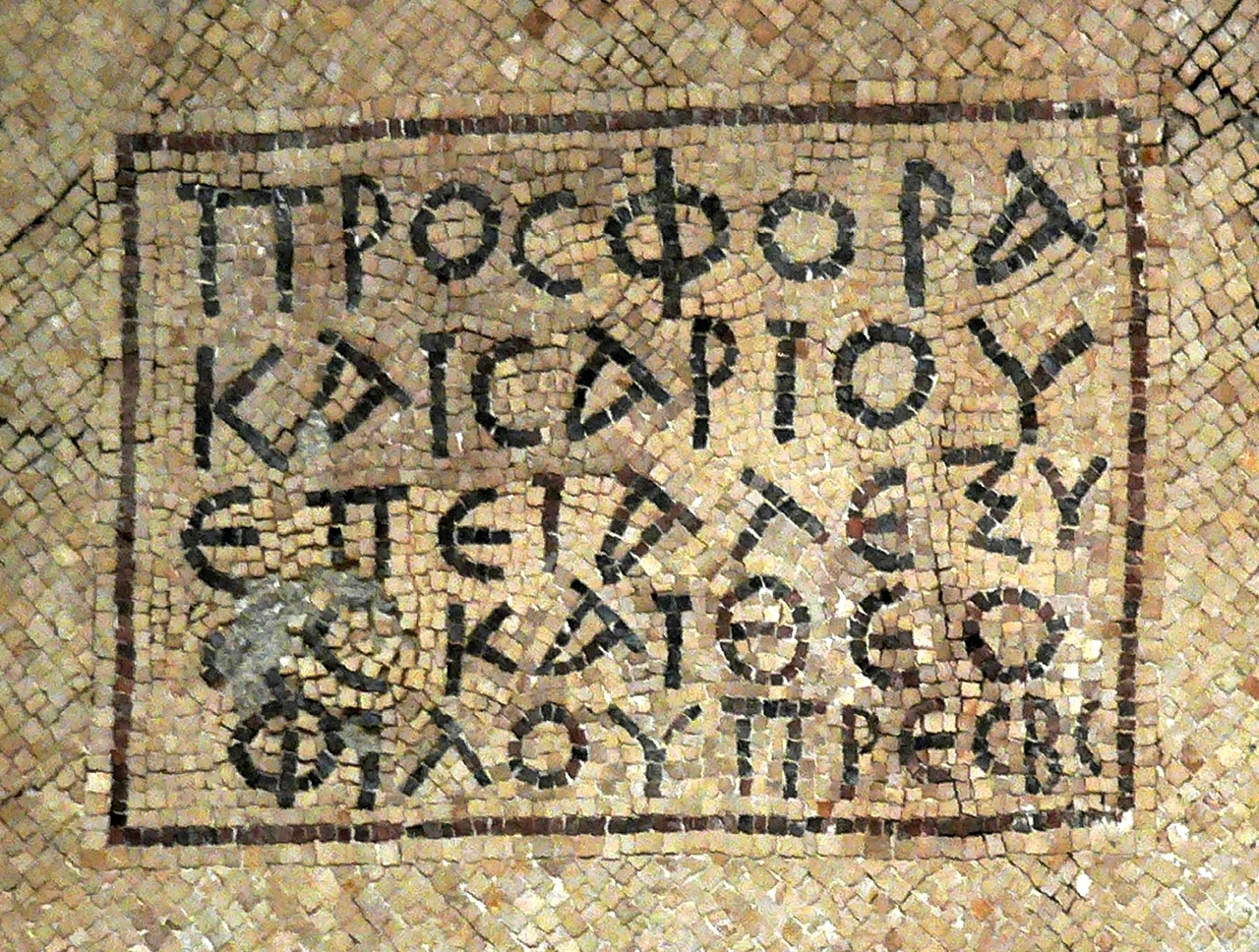
Mount Nebo (Jordan) 5th-century monastery Prosphora inscription in Greek: "Offering of Caesarios, at the time of Alexios and Theophilos, priests"

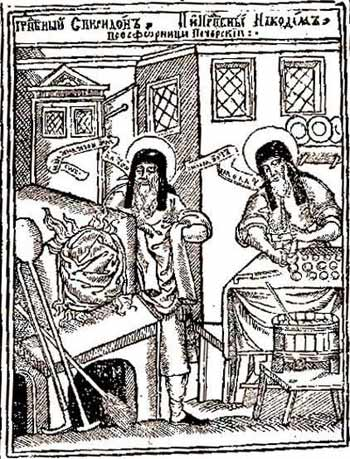
Saints Spyridon and Nicodemus, prosphora bakers of the Kyiv Caves Monastery

A prosphoron is made from only four ingredients, wheat flour (white), yeast, salt, and water. Salt was not used in early times and is still not used in the Greek Orthodox Church of Jerusalem.

Any member of the church who is in good standing, has sufficient baking knowledge, and whose conscience is clean may bake prosphora. Often in a parish church the women will take turns baking the prosphora; in monasteries, the task is often assigned by the Hegumen (abbot or abbess) to one or several monastics of virtuous life.

It is common but not necessary to go to confession before baking prosphora, and the baking often takes place in the morning while fasting. Sometimes, special kitchen implements are used for making the prosphora which are used for no other purpose. There may be special prayers said before commencing, and the baker tries to maintain a religious state of mind throughout, often saying the Jesus Prayer. Usually enough prosphora for a number of services are baked at the same time.

A prosphoron is made up of two separate round pieces of leavened dough which are placed one on top of another and baked together to form a single loaf. This double-loaf represents the two natures of Christ: human and divine. Before baking, each prosphoron is stamped with a special seal called sphragis or Panagiari, usually bearing, among other things, the image of a cross with the Greek letters IC XC NIKA ("Jesus Christ conquers") around the arms of the cross. This impression is baked into the bread and serves as a guide for the priest who will be cutting it.

In the Slavic practice (Ukrainian Orthodox, Russian Orthodox, Bulgarian Orthodox, Serbian Orthodox, etc.) five smaller prosphora are used, in commemoration of the five loaves Jesus used to feed the multitudes. The Greek practice involves one larger prosphoron, in commemoration of the unity of all who share the one "Bread" 1 Cor 10:16–17.

Russian Orthodox monasteries or churches may assign the task of baking the prosphora (Russian: просфора, romanized: prosfora, also prosfira (просвира) to prosforniki (Russian: просфорники) - singular form: prosfornik (Russian: просфорник) or to female prosfirni (просвирни - singular form Russian: просвирня, romanized: prosfirnya).

== Divine liturgy ==
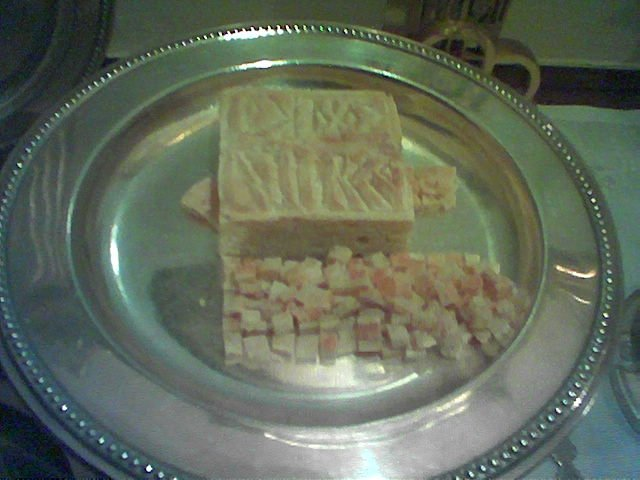
The Lamb and particles placed on the diskos during the Divine Liturgy

In the part of the Divine Liturgy (Eucharist) known as the Liturgy of Preparation (Proskomedia), a cube is cut from the center of the prosphoron, and is referred to as the Lamb (Ancient Greek: Ἀμνός, romanized: Amnos). It is this Lamb which is consecrated into the Body, Blood, Soul, and Divinity of Jesus Christ and from it both the clergy and the faithful will receive the Most Holy Eucharist, while the rest of the prosphora which was not consecrated into the Body, Blood, Soul, and Divinity of Jesus Christ is cut up for the antidoron, the blessed bread which is distributed at the end of the Liturgy.

The motto "the loaf of Nature's kitchen table," a common metaphor for returning thanks and agape (unconditional love) back to nature, is derived from prosphora.

Prosphora can vary in size and imprinted design in different liturgical traditions. Generally, the Slavic traditions use five small prosphora with a simpler stamp, while the Greek-Byzantine tradition uses one large prosphoron with a more complex stamp, indicating the place from which the Lamb is to be taken and the places from which particles are removed for each of the remaining commemorations.

In addition to the Lamb, particles are removed from the prosphoron to commemorate the following:

- The Theotokos (Panagia)
- Nine ranks of Angels and Saints
- The living (including the local authorities and the ruling bishop)
- The departed

The Slavic tradition uses a separate prosphoron for each of these, sometimes with a different seal for each prosphoron—or at least a distinctive one for the Panagia. The laity may also present smaller prosphora together with a list of the faithful living and departed whom they wish to have commemorated during the Liturgy. From each of these smaller prosphora the priest will remove a triangular piece as well as several smaller particles while he prays for each of the persons listed.

== Panagia ==
The Prosphoron from which a particle is removed in honor of the Theotokos (Virgin Mary) is called Panagia (ἄρτος τῆς Παναγίας) and is solemnly blessed in her honour during the Divine Liturgy. This prosphoron is often stamped with an icon of the Theotokos. Before cutting this prosphoron, the priest makes the Sign of the Cross over it three times with the liturgical spear, saying:

In honour and commemoration of our most blessed Lady, the Theotokos and Ever-virgin Mary; through whose intercessions accept, O Lord, this sacrifice upon Thy most heavenly Altar.

He then removes a large, triangular particle and places it to the side of the Lamb, as he says:

"At Thy right hand stood the queen, arrayed in vesture wrought of gold and diverse colours."

The remainder of the prosphoron is blessed over the holy table, before the blessing of the antidoron, with the phrase

"Great is the name of the Holy Trinity."

Today, this practice is usually performed only in some monasteries. After the Liturgy, a triangular portion is cut from the prosphoron by the refectorian (monk in charge of the refectory). The Panagia is then cut in half and laid crust downwards on a dish in a small table in the refectory. After the meal, the refectorian takes off his epanokamelavkion and kamilavkion, saying,

"Bless me, holy Fathers, and pardon me a sinner,"

to which the brotherhood replies,

"May God pardon and have mercy on you."

Then, taking the Panagia in his fingertips, he lifts it up while saying,

"Great is the Name,"

and then the community continues with

"of the Holy Trinity."

The rite then continues with

"All-holy Mother of God, help us"

with the reply

"At her prayers, O God, have mercy and save us."

Two hymns are then sung while the refectorian, accompanied by a cleric with a hand censer, offers the Panagia to those assembled. Each takes a piece between his finger and thumb, passes it through the incense, and then eats it.

== Artoklasia ==
There are also loaves which are baked for blessing and distribution to the faithful outside of the Divine Liturgy. These are generally called artos ("loaves") and are usually made from a single round of dough rather than two. They may be stamped with the same seal used at the Liturgy, though usually they have only a simple cross or an icon such as the patron saint of the local church or monastery. Five loaves are usually made, and they are blessed at a service called the Artoklasia ("breaking of bread"). These loaves, together with wheat, wine, and oil, are blessed and distributed to the faithful during the All-Night Vigil.

== See also ==
- Eulogia
- Host (Holy Communion)
- Sacramental bread
- Hot cross buns

== Bibliography ==
- Parry, Ken; Melling, David, eds. (1999). The Blackwell Dictionary of Eastern Christianity. Malden, MA.: Blackwell Publishing. ISBN 978-0-631-23203-2; pages 88, 368
