= Pastophorion =

Church architectural term

Pastophorion (Greek: παστοφόριον, romanized: pastophórion; Latin: pastophorium) is one of two chambers within an early Christian and Eastern Christian church building used as sacristies—the diaconicon and the prothesis.

Originally, in the Greek Old Testament the term "pastophorion" referred to the treasury and the priests' quarters in the Temple of Solomon. Since at least the end of the 4th century, pastophorion was a sacristy located at the eastern part of the church building. In the Eastern Christian architecture, the pastophoria are adjacent to the apse, flanking the central space of the bema, and sometimes form with it a tripartite sanctuary. The sacristy located to the north is known as prothesis and that to the south as diaconicon. These chambers are directly connected with the apse or bema by doorways. They account for the triple apses which became current in the Byzantine church architecture in the 9th century.
