= Entrance (liturgical) =

Eastern Christian liturgical ritual

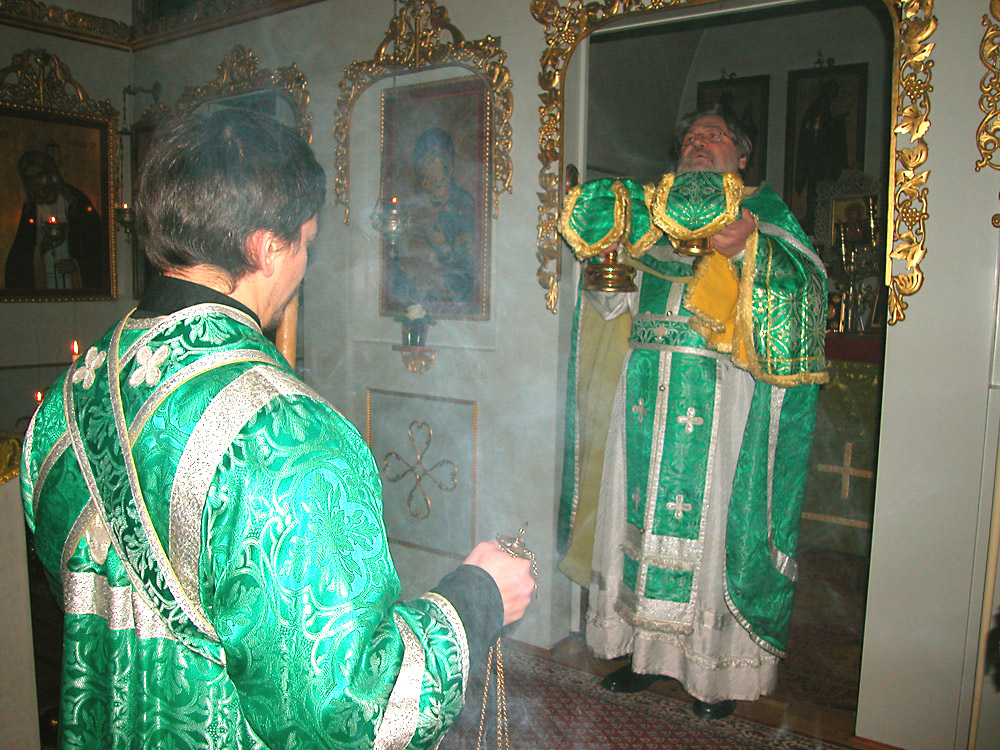
Orthodox subdeacon and priest making the Great Entrance during the Divine Liturgy.

In Eastern Orthodox and Byzantine-rite Catholic churches, an entrance is a procession during which the clergy enter into the sanctuary through the Holy Doors. The origin of these entrances goes back to the early church, when the liturgical books and sacred vessels were kept in special storage rooms for safe keeping and the procession was necessary to bring these objects into the church when needed. Over the centuries, these processions have grown more elaborate, and nowadays are accompanied by incense, candles and liturgical fans. In the liturgical theology of the Eastern Orthodox Church, the angels are believed to enter with the clergy into the sanctuary, as evidenced by the prayers which accompany the various entrances.

== Divine Liturgy ==
During the course of the Divine Liturgy (Eucharist), there are two entrances. Both of the Entrances, as well as the ritual of the Liturgy of Preparation, are viewed by liturgical scholars as later additions to the Liturgy, and may not have been used by Saints Basil the Great or John Chrysostom, the authors of the most commonly used forms of the Divine Liturgy.

=== Little Entrance ===
The Little Entrance occurs during the portion of the service known as the Liturgy of the Catechumens, in preparation for the scriptural readings. The priest takes the Gospel Book from the Holy Table (altar), and hands it to the deacon (if there is no deacon, he carries the Gospel Book himself.) They go counterclockwise around the Holy Table and out the North Door of the Iconostasis, and come to stop in front of the Holy Doors, while the priest prays silently the Prayer of the Entrance:

O Master, Lord our God, Who hast appointed in heaven ranks and hosts of Angels and Archangels for the ministry of Thy glory: Cause that with our entrance may enter also the holy Angels with us serving Thee, and with us glorifying Thy goodness. For unto Thee are due all glory, honour and worship, to the Father, and to the Son, and to the Holy Spirit, now and ever, and unto the ages of ages. Amen.

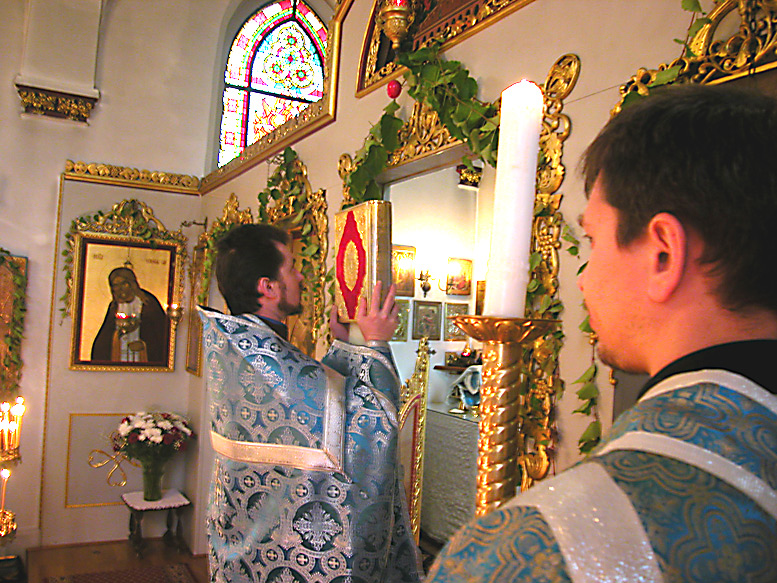
The Little Entrance during the Divine Liturgy (Church of the Protection of the Theotokos, Düsseldorf, Germany).

The deacon presents the Gospel Book for the priest to kiss (if the bishop is present, it is presented to him instead) The deacon then points to the Holy Doors with his orarion, and bowing says to the priest, "Bless, Master, the holy entrance." The priest blesses with his hand and says, "Blessed is the entrance of Thy holy ones, always, now and ever, and unto the ages of ages." When the choir finishes singing the Third Antiphon (usually the Beatitudes), the deacon (or priest) lifts up the Gospel Book and says, "Wisdom! Let us attend!" (if it is a Great Feast of the Lord, he first says a special entrance verse, usually taken from the Psalms) The choir then sings the Entrance Hymn: "Come let us worship and fall down before Christ! O Son of God, save us who sing to Thee: Alleluia!" and the Troparia and Kontakia of the day. Meanwhile, the deacon and priest go in through the Holy Doors, the deacon replaces the Gospel Book on the Holy Table, and both he and the priest kiss the Holy Table. The priest silently says the Prayer of the Trisagion.

This entrance is quite elaborate when the bishop is present and a Hierarchical Divine Liturgy is being served, since it is at this time that the bishop himself also enters the sanctuary for the first time. Until that point he has been standing upon the episcopal kathedra (ambo) in the center of the church. Also, when a bishop is to be consecrated, the rite takes place at the Little Entrance. This is also the point in the Liturgy when the bishop will bestow ecclesiastical awards and honours.

After the troparia and kontakia, the choir begins the Trisagion: "Holy God, Holy Mighty, Holy Immortal One, have mercy on us!" The chanting of the Trisagion at the Little Entrance is said to have been miraculously revealed to St. Proclus, Patriarch of Constantinople (434 -447). On certain Great Feasts of the church year, the Trisagion is replaced by another hymn, taken from Galatians 3:27 "As many as have been baptized into Christ, have put on Christ! Alleluia!" On Feasts of the Cross, the Trisagion is replaced by the hymn, "Before Thy Cross, we bow down in worship, O Master, and Thy holy Resurrection we glorify!" During the Trisagion, or its alternate hymn, the priest and deacon go to the High Place (seats for the bishop and priests to the east of the Holy Table) to prepare for the reading of the Epistle and Gospel.

The Little Entrance symbolizes the Incarnation of Christ and his baptism in the Jordan River: the deacon representing John the Baptist, and the priest representing Christ. Because the first coming of Christ was in humility, the priest is instructed in the rubrics to make the entrance with his hands at his side.

=== Great Entrance ===
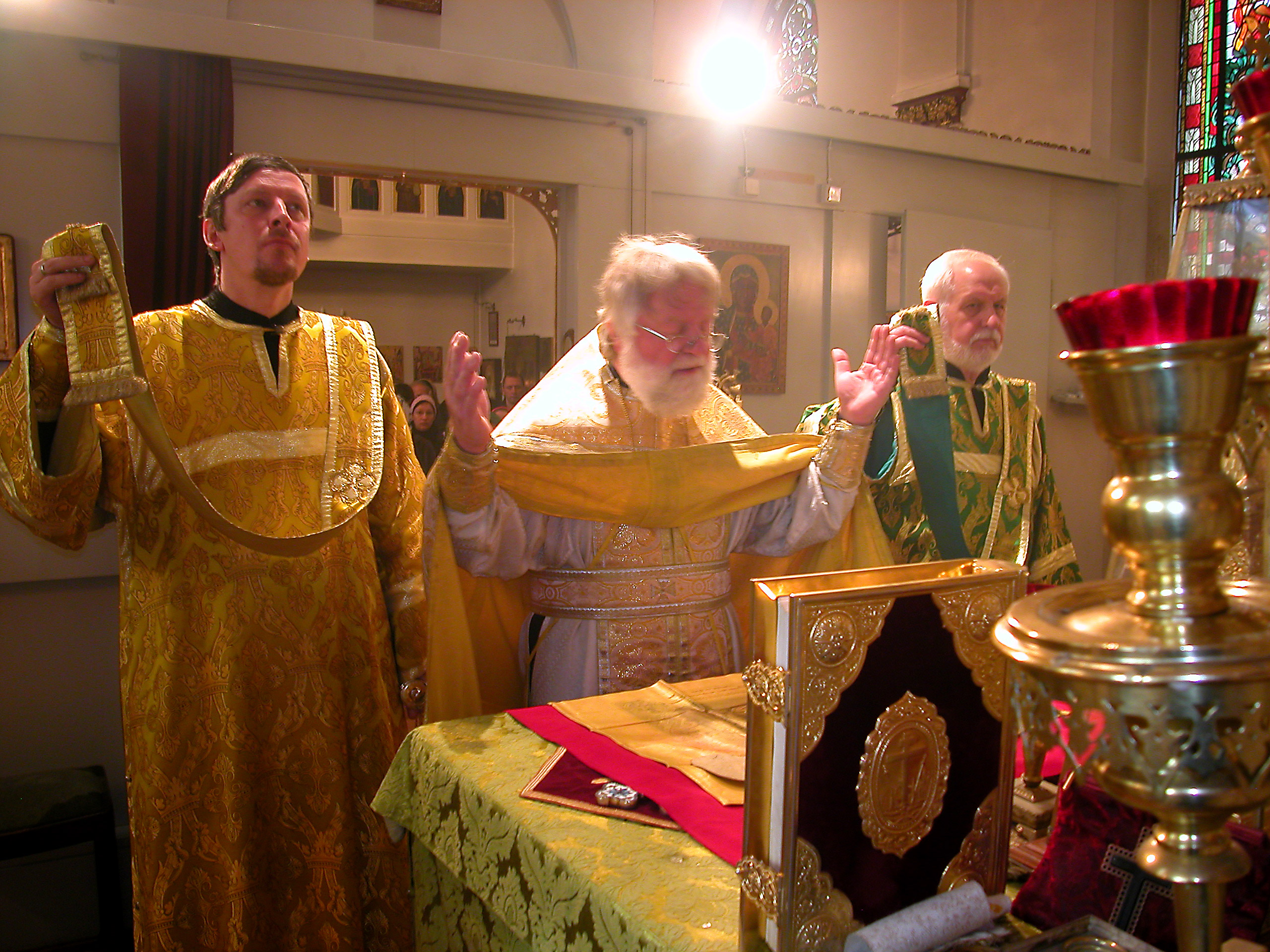
Orthodox priest and deacons praying the Cherubic Hymn at the beginning of the Great Entrance.

The Great Entrance occurs at a later point during the Divine Liturgy, near the beginning of the Liturgy of the Faithful, when the Gifts (bread and wine) to be offered are carried from the Chapel of Prothesis (a table on the north side of the sanctuary sometimes occupying its own apse), to be placed on the Holy Table.

This entrance is made during the chanting of the Cherubic Hymn The Cherubikon that accompanies the Great Entrance was apparently added by the Emperor Justin II (565 - 578) However, the Divine Liturgies celebrated on Holy Thursday and Holy Saturday have their own unique Cherubic Hymns.

When the Choir begins the Cherubic Hymn, the deacon begins a censing of the sanctuary, iconostasis, clergy and faithful while the priest prays a long silent prayer known as the "Prayer of the Cherubic Hymn". After the prayer and the censing are finished, the priest and deacon make three metanias (bows) in front of the Holy Table, raise their hands, and say the Cherubic Hymn three times (the priest saying the first half and the deacon(s) saying the second half), each recitation followed by another metania. They then kiss the Holy Table, and bow to each other. The deacon goes behind the Holy Table to the Table of Oblation (Prothesis) and the priest comes out of the Holy Doors to bow to the people, asking their forgiveness. He then goes to the prothesis, censes the offering, and places the Aër (a large veil which covers the diskos and chalice) on the deacon's left shoulder—if there is no deacon, he places the veil over his own back so that it makes a cape covering his shoulders—and gives the diskos (paten) to the deacon, while he carries the chalice. The deacon, still holding the censer, raises the diskos so that it is at the level of his brow. The procession forms with servers (acolytes) holding candles and (depending upon the jurisdiction) ceremonial fans.

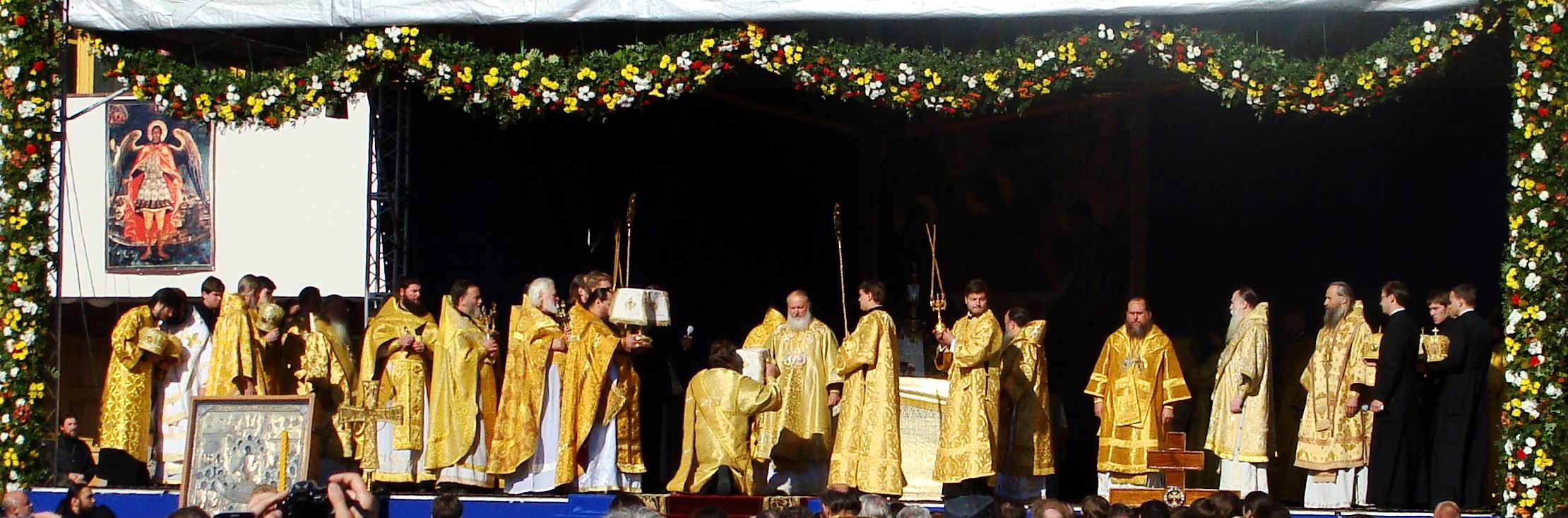
Great Entrance at an outdoor hierarchical Divine Liturgy. In the center the protodeacon with the diskos is kneeling in front of the bishop.

As soon as the choir finishes the first half of the Cherubic Hymn the procession goes out the North Door, into the nave and halts in front of the Holy Doors. During the procession, the deacon and priest make a series of intercessions formulated according to local custom. During the last intercession, the priest blesses the faithful with the chalice. The choir sings, "Amen." and chants the second half of the Cherubic Hymn, during which the clergy enter the sanctuary through the Holy Doors and place the gifts on the Holy Table. The priest removes the smaller veils from the diskos and chalice and censes the gifts, saying special prayers together with the deacon

The Great Entrance symbolizes the triumphal entry of Christ into Jerusalem on Palm Sunday.

== Vespers ==
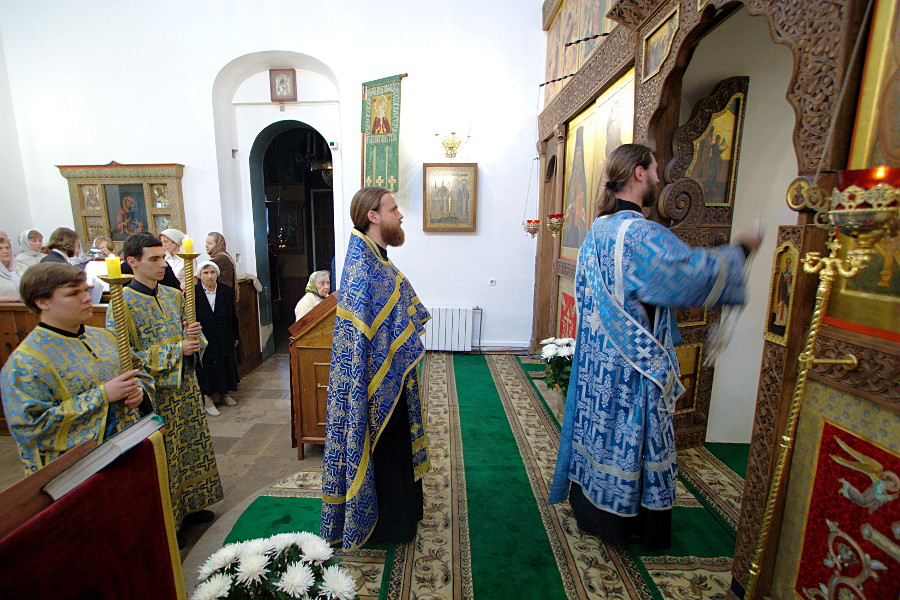
Orthodox priest and deacon making the Entrance with the censer at Great Vespers.

There is also an Entrance made during Great Vespers (served on Sundays and feast days). This follows exactly the same format as the Little Entrance at Liturgy, except that the censer is carried instead of the Gospel Book, and the silent prayer said by the priest is different:

In the evening, and in the morning, and at noonday we praise Thee, we bless Thee, we give thanks unto Thee, and we pray unto Thee, O Lord of all: Direct Thou our prayer before Thee as incense, and incline not our hearts unto words or thoughts of wickedness: but deliver us from all who seek after our souls. For unto Thee, Lord, O Lord, lift we up our eyes, and in Thee have we trusted. Put us not to shame, O our God. For unto Thee are due all glory, honour and worship, to the Father and to the Son and to the Holy Spirit, now and ever and unto the ages of ages. Amen.

If there will be a reading from the Gospel during Vespers that day, as occurs during Holy Week or the Divine Liturgy of the Presanctified Gifts, the deacon will carry the Gospel Book instead of the censer.

This entrance occurs during the singing of the dogmatikon that concludes the verses of Lord I have cried (Psalm 140 LXX, etc.) and immediately prior to the singing of O Gladsome Light. This entrance is not performed during either Daily Vespers (the ordinary weekday celebration of Vespers) or Little Vespers (an abbreviated form of Vespers served before an All-Night Vigil).

== Presanctified Liturgy ==
The Liturgy of the Presanctified Gifts is celebrated on Wednesdays and Fridays during Great Lent and is a Vespers service combined with the distribution of Holy Communion that had been consecrated the previous Sunday. The Little Entrance here is the same entrance of Great Vespers; however, when a Gospel reading is prescribed (during Holy Week or on feast days), the Gospel Book is used instead of the censer. The Great Entrance is performed in absolute silence (rather than the choir singing, as at the normal Divine Liturgy). while all prostrate themselves. The reason for this is because the elements carried in the Great Entrance are not simply bread and wine (as at the normal Liturgy), but have already been Consecrated, and are believed to be the actual Body and Blood of Christ.
