= Liturgy of Preparation =

Easter Orthodox name for Eucharist preparation

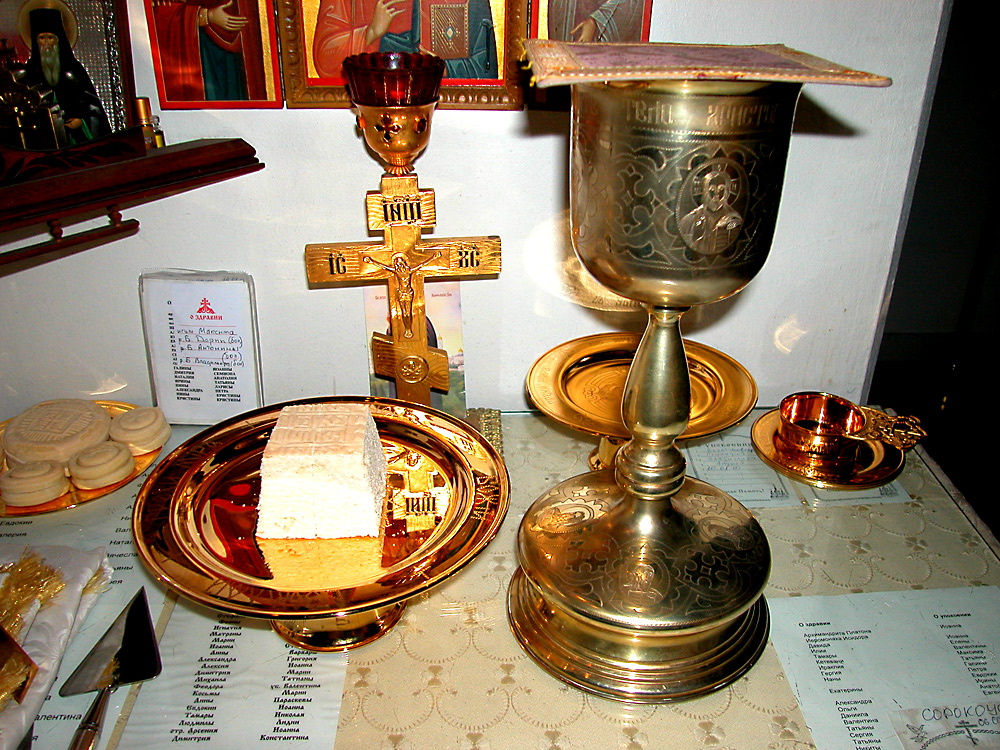
The Altar of Prothesis, set with the diskos (left), chalice (right) and other implements needed for the Liturgy of Preparation. The Lamb sits on the diskos (paten). To the left are Prosphora for the Theotokos, the saints, the living and the departed.

The Liturgy of Preparation, also Prothesis (Ancient Greek: Πρόθεσις, lit. 'a setting forth') or Proskomedia (Προσκομιδή Proskomidē 'an offering, an oblation'), is the name given in the Eastern Orthodox Church (Note: and those Eastern Catholic Churches which follow the Byzantine Rite) to the act of preparing the bread and wine for the Eucharist.

== Eucharistic elements ==
Only very specific elements may be offered at the Divine Liturgy:

=== Bread ===
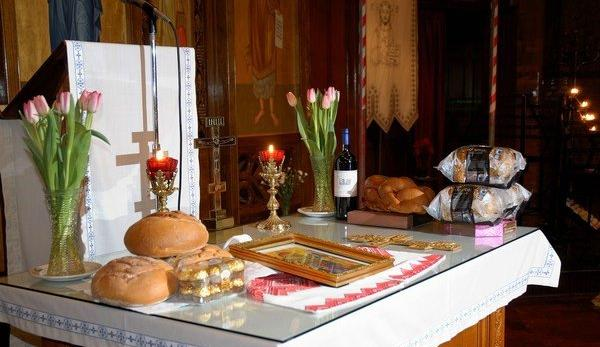
Prosphora prepared for the Liturgy of Preparation. The large loaves on the left are the five principal prosphora; the smaller loaves on the right are for the commemorations of the living and the dead by the faithful (Ukrainian Catholic Cathedral, London).

The bread used for the Liturgy is referred to as prosphora. A prosphoron is a round loaf of leavened bread baked in two layers to represent the two natures of Christ. It has a square seal on the top side which has inscribed on it a cross and the Greek letters IC (an abbreviation in Greek for "Jesus") XC ("Christ") and NIKA ("Conquers"). The portion of the loaf that is cut out along this seal is the Lamb (Host), from which all are communicated, and therefore must be proportionately large for the number of communicants.

Prosphora must be made using only the finest wheat flour, water, salt, and yeast. It should be freshly baked and without blemish.

The Greeks use one large loaf for the Liturgy of Preparation, with a large round seal on it inscribed not only with the square seal mentioned above (from which the Lamb is taken), but also markings indicating where the portions for the Theotokos, the Ranks, the Living and Dead are removed (see Proskomedie, below).

Those churches which follow Slavic usage use five small loaves, recalling the five loaves from which Christ fed the multitude (John 6:5–14). Normally all are stamped with a small square seal, though special seals for the Theotokos are sometimes used.

=== Wine ===
The wine used must be red grape wine, and it must be fermented. Orthodox tend to favor altar wine that is somewhat sweet, though this is not a requirement.

These elements are referred to collectively as the "Gifts", both before and after the Consecration.

== Ceremony ==
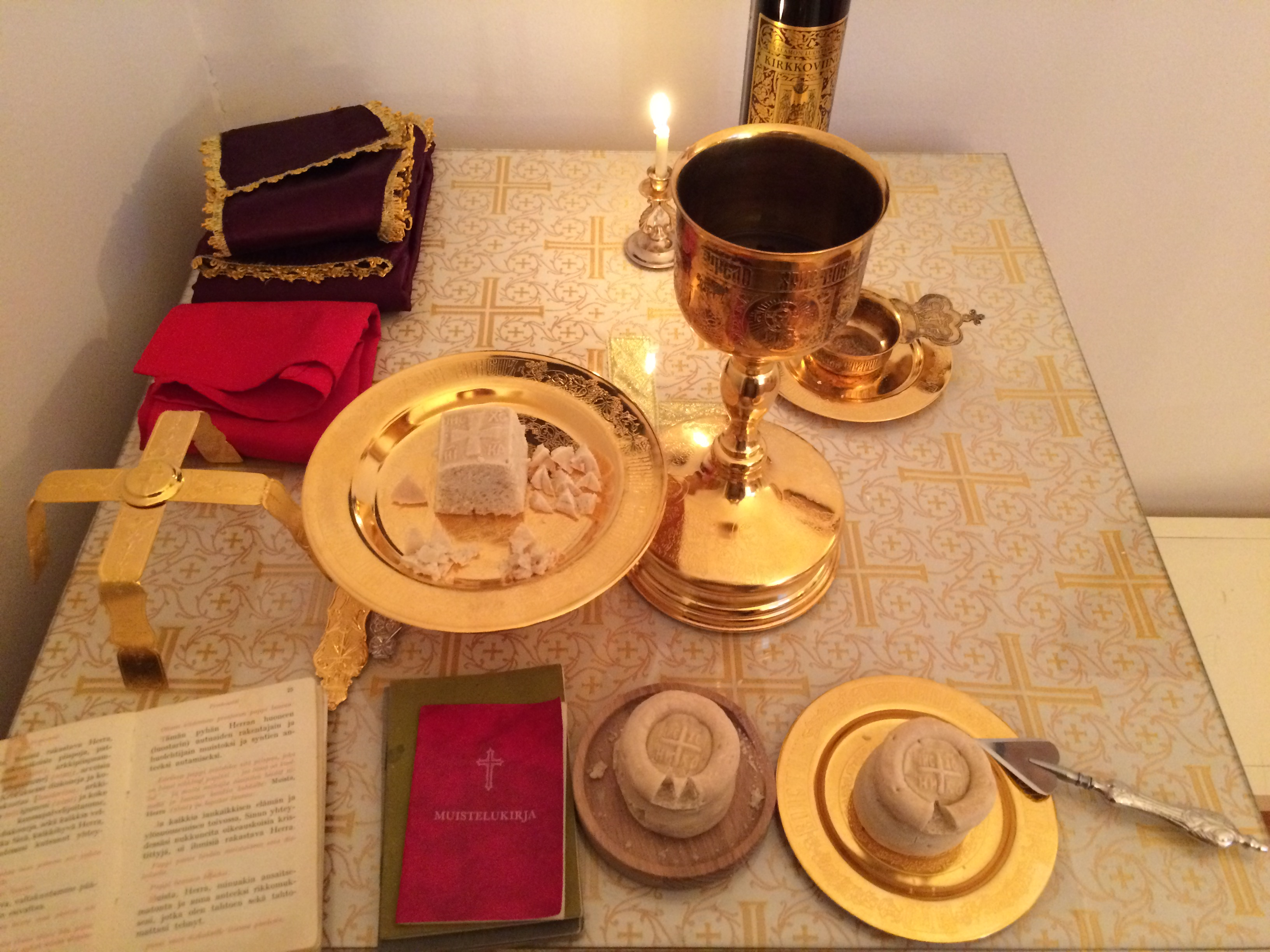
Liturgy of Preparation just before conclusion

The Priest's Service Book states that, before celebrating the Divine Liturgy, the priest must be reconciled to all men, keep his heart from evil thoughts, and be fasting since midnight. The same rules apply to the deacon.

The beginning of the Liturgy of Preparation should be timed so that it is concluded slightly before the Reader finishes reading the Third Hour and Sixth Hour.

=== Kairon ===
The priests and deacons celebrating the liturgy stand together in front of the holy doors of the iconostasis, venerate the icons, and say special entrance prayers before they enter into the altar. (Note: Among Eastern Christians, the entire sanctuary may be referred to as the "Altar"; the Altar Table itself being referred to as either the "Holy Table" or the "Throne.") At the end of these prayers, they bow to the throne of the bishop who oversees the church, or, if it is a monastery, the abbot, acknowledging the authority of their spiritual superiors, without whose permission they may not celebrate the divine services.

=== Vesting ===
Next, the priests and deacons venerate the holy table and vest. For each vestment, the priest blesses it, kisses the cross on it, and dons it reciting a Biblical verse, usually from the Psalms. The deacon brings his vestments to the priest to bless, kisses the priest's hand, and likewise for each vestment kisses the cross on it and dons it, but only for the sticharion recites a verse, the same verse for it as does the priest. Each subdeacon, reader, and server vests in the same manner as a deacon, except for not reciting anything. If a bishop who is not celebrating is present, he, rather than the priest, may bless their vestments.

After vesting, the priest and deacon wash their hands, saying the Prayer of the Washing of Hands (Psalm 26:6-12) They then go to the Prothesis (Table of Oblation) where the Gifts are to be prepared.

=== Proskomedia ===
If there are several priests concelebrating, usually only one—traditionally, the most junior— celebrates the Proskomedia. Others may assist in taking out particles for the living and the dead. In the Greek traditions (Constantinople, Antioch, etc.) all particles are frequently taken from one large prosphoron which is stamped with a seal that serves as a template, but in the Slavic traditions there are several (usually five) prosphora, from which particles are taken as described below.

==== The Lamb ====
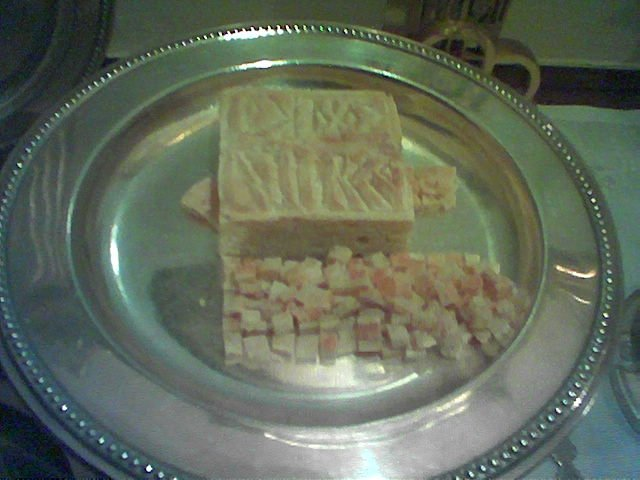
The Lamb and particles placed on the diskos. The large triangle to the viewer's left of the Lamb is the particle for the Theotokos; to the right of the Lamb are the particles for the nine ranks (saints); below the Lamb are the particles commemorating the living and the departed.

The priest takes a prosphoron and blesses it three times, making the sign of the cross over it with the liturgical spear. Then, cutting on all four sides of the square seal on the prosphoron, he removes a cube (the Lamb), taking from both layers of the loaf, and places it in the center of the diskos. He then cuts the underside of the Lamb, making a cross, then turns the Lamb right side up and pierces it with the spear, saying the words from the Gospel (John 19:34–35). (See Lamb for more details).

The deacon mingles a little water (Note: This commemorates the fact that, when the soldiers pierced Christs' side with a spear, blood and water came forth.) with the wine that is poured in the chalice and presents it to the priest for him to bless. The deacon then pours the wine and water into the chalice, as the priest says, "Blessed be the union of Thy holy things, now and ever, and unto the ages of ages. Amen."

==== The Theotokos ====
Next the priest takes up the second prosphoron, (Note: The Greeks perform all of the same actions as the Russians, but they use only one loaf, removing all particles from the same loaf. The instructions here presume the celebrant is using five loaves.) blesses it with the spear, and cuts a large, triangular particle from it, which he places on the diskos next to the Lamb (Note: The particle for the Theotokos is placed to the Lamb's right (i.e., the celebrant's left, in remembrance of the Psalm vere, "The queen stood at the King's right hand."(Psalm 44:8).) in commemoration of the Theotokos. This loaf (if it is a separate loaf) is sometimes sealed with an icon of the Mother of God, or with her monogram.

==== The ranks ====
Next, the priest takes up the prosphoron of the Nine Ranks. From this loaf are taken smaller triangular particles in commemoration of the various ranks of saints. There are some differences between the Greek and the Slavic texts as to which particular saints are named, but the intent is that all of the saints are included. Saint John the Forerunner and the Patron Saint of the church or monastery are always named. The number nine was chosen because that is the traditional number of the ranks of angels.

These nine particles are placed to the left of the Lamb (i.e., to the priest's right, as he looks down on the diskos).

==== The living ====
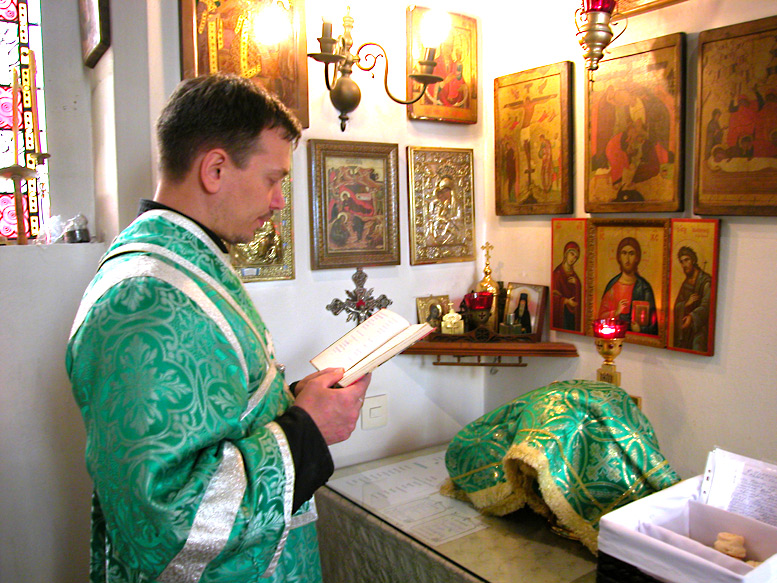
Subdeacon reading the names of the living and the departed during the Liturgy of Preparation

Then the priest takes up the prosphoron for the Living. He takes out a larger particle in commemoration of the Patriarch (or Synod of Bishops), and a second larger particle in commemoration of the Ruler (in former times, this would have been the Emperor, but nowadays it reflects the government of the local nation in which the church is located). He then takes out smaller particles in commemoration of others among the living. He must always commemorate the Bishop who ordained him (if he is still among the living), the clergy who are concelebrating with him, and any living Orthodox Christian whom he wishes. Churches and monasteries often have diptychs (memorial books) of the living and departed who should be commemorated at every Liturgy.

Among the Slavic peoples, it is customary for the laity to offer small prosphora in commemoration of those living and the departed whom they would like to have prayed for during the Liturgy. These often are smaller than the five prosphora used by the priest. They hand these to the priest together with their list of names, and he takes particles out (living from the top of the loaf, departed from the bottom) and place them on the diskos. The loaves are returned to the faithful.

All of the particles for the living are placed in a line below the Lamb and the particles for the Theotokos and saints.

Only Orthodox Christians may be commemorated on the diskos at the Proskomedia.

==== The departed ====
From the prosphoron of the departed the priest takes a larger particle as a general memorial of the departed hierarchs, rulers and the founders of the local church or monastery. He then takes out smaller particles in commemoration of departed Orthodox Christians. He commemorates the bishop who ordained him (if he is departed) and any of the departed whom he will, as well as the names in the diptychs and those presented by the faithful.

All of the particles for the departed are placed in a line below the particles for the living.

Before the conclusion, any concelebrating priests who would like to make their own commemorations of the living and the departed may do so.

==== The celebrant himself ====
For the last commemoration, the priest takes out a particle for himself, saying: "Remember, O Lord, mine unworthy self, and pardon me every transgression, whether voluntary or involuntary."

==== Conclusion ====
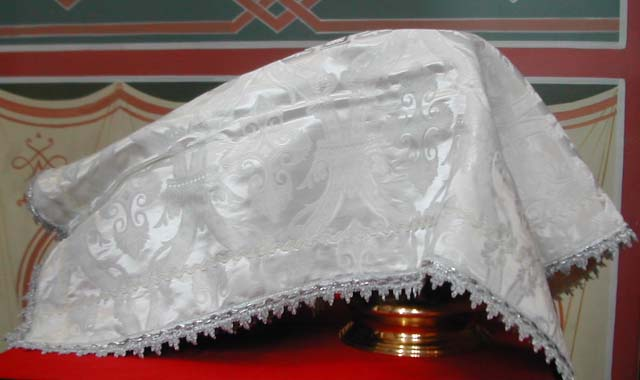
The diskos and chalice covered by the Aër at the conclusion of the Proskomedie

The deacon places incense in the censer and holds it up for the priest to bless. The priest blesses the incense saying the Prayer of the Censer. Next, the priest takes the Asterisk (star cover), holds it over the censer and then places it on the diskos, saying: "And the star came and stood over the place where the young child was."

He then holds each of the smaller veils over the censer and places them on the discos and the chalice, respectively, saying appropriate prayers for each.

Then he takes the larger veil, called the Aër, wraps it around the censer and then covers the chalice and diskos together.

Finally, he takes the censer from the deacon and censes the covered Gifts. He then says the concluding Prayer of Offering (unless a bishop is celebrating; see below).

Afterwards, the deacon performs a full censing of the prothesis, the holy table, the sanctuary, the entire church and the people while he recites the following hymn and Psalm 50 quietly to himself:

In the Tomb with the body, and in Hades with the soul, in Paradise with the thief, and on the Throne with the Father and the Spirit, wast thou, O Christ, who art everywhere present and fillest all things.

== Hierarchical Liturgy ==
When a bishop is serving the divine liturgy, one of the priests and the deacons and lower clergy vest (Note: Any other priests who are concelebrating do not vest until after the arrival of the bishop.) and the Liturgy of Preparation is performed as normal with a few omissions which are later performed by the bishop: the other clergy who are serving are not commemorated, the concluding Prayer of Offering is not said, and the offerings are not censed. When the liturgy neither immediately follows matins nor is in conjunction with vespers, the reading of the hours generally does not commence until after the arrival of the bishop. (Note: Patriarchs or other bishops of high dignity arrive toward the end of the hours.)

When it is time, the bishop enters formally into the church and the deacons recite the Entrance Prayers and he is then vested by the subdeacons while the deacons read the Vesting Prayers. Then the Reader begins the Little Hours or vespers commences or matins conclude, as the case may be.

During the great litany the bishop himself recites the Prayer of Offering omitted earlier from the usual order of the prothesis.

Just before the Great Entrance, the bishop commemorates those whom he wishes, taking out particles from a special prosphoron that has been prepared for him. Then each priest, deacon, and server approaches the bishop and kissing the bishop's right shoulder says his own name, by which the bishop takes out a particle commemorating him. Finally, the bishop censes the offerings.

== Great Lent ==
During Great Lent it is not permitted to celebrate the Divine Liturgy on weekdays. However, on Wednesdays and Fridays the faithful may receive Holy Communion from the reserved Mysteries (Sacrament) at the Liturgy of the Presanctified Gifts. In order to provide for these services, on the Sunday before, the priest must cut out extra Lambs for each Presanctified Liturgy that there will be during that week.

== Pascha ==
During Bright Week (The week following Easter Sunday) most of the services are quite radically different than during the rest of the year. However, at the Liturgy of Preparation, only the Entrance Prayers change; everything else remains the same.

== Oriental Orthodox ==
The various Oriental Orthodox Churches also have Liturgies of Preparation before the commencement of the public portion of the Divine Liturgy. `Some of these are very simple, and some are more complex. They all involve the entry of the clergy, vesting and preparing the Gifts of bread and wine, accompanied by appropriate prayers.
