= Prothesis (altar) =

Recess used for preparation of the Eucharist in Orthodox churches

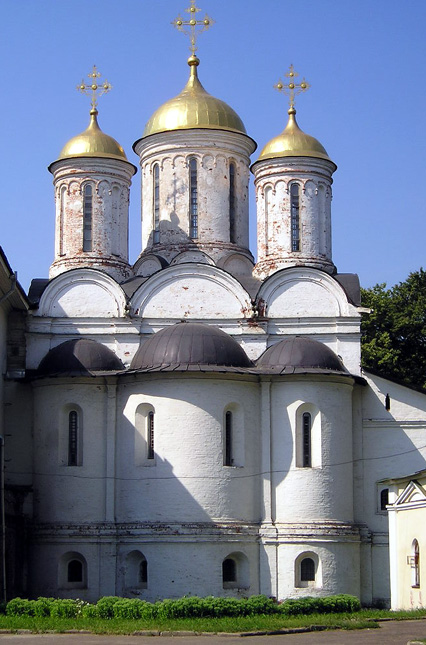
The triple apse of an Orthodox Church. The altar is in the larger central apse, the prothesis in the apse to the right, and the diaconicon in the one to the left.

The prothesis is the place in the sanctuary in which the Liturgy of Preparation takes place in the Eastern Orthodox and Greek Catholic Churches. Prothesis and diaconicon are collectively referred to as pastophoria.

The prothesis is located behind the iconostasis and consists of a small table, also known as the Table of Oblation, on which the bread and wine are prepared for the Divine Liturgy. The table will often bear the items being used for the preparation: the chalice, cutting implements, cloths and other items. It is most often placed on the north side of the altar, or in a separate chamber (itself referred to as the prothesis) on the north side of the central apse.

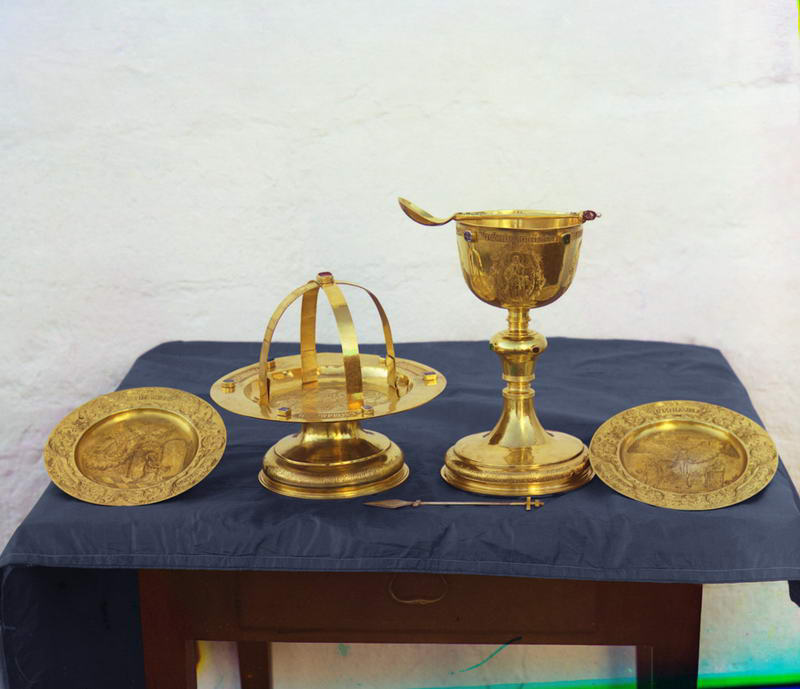
Sacred vessels used in the Orthodox Divine Liturgy (photograph by Sergey Prokudin-Gorsky, 1911)

During the reign of the Emperor Justin II (565–574), it came to occupy its own separate chamber to the north of the sanctuary, having a separate apse, and joined to the altar by an arched opening. Another apsed chamber was added on the south side for the diaconicon. So that from this time forward, large Orthodox Churches were triapsidal (having three apses on the eastern side). Smaller churches still have only one chamber containing the altar, the prothesis and the diaconicon.

In the Syriac Churches, the ritual is different, as both prothesis and diaconicon are generally rectangular, and the former constitutes a chamber for the deposit of offerings by the faithful. Consequently, it is sometimes placed on the south side, if by doing so it is more accessible to the laity.

In the Coptic Orthodox Church, the men will enter the prothesis to receive Holy Communion (the women receive in front of the holy doors), and must remove their shoes before entering.

== See also ==
- Altar
- Diaconicon
