= Vasa Sacra =

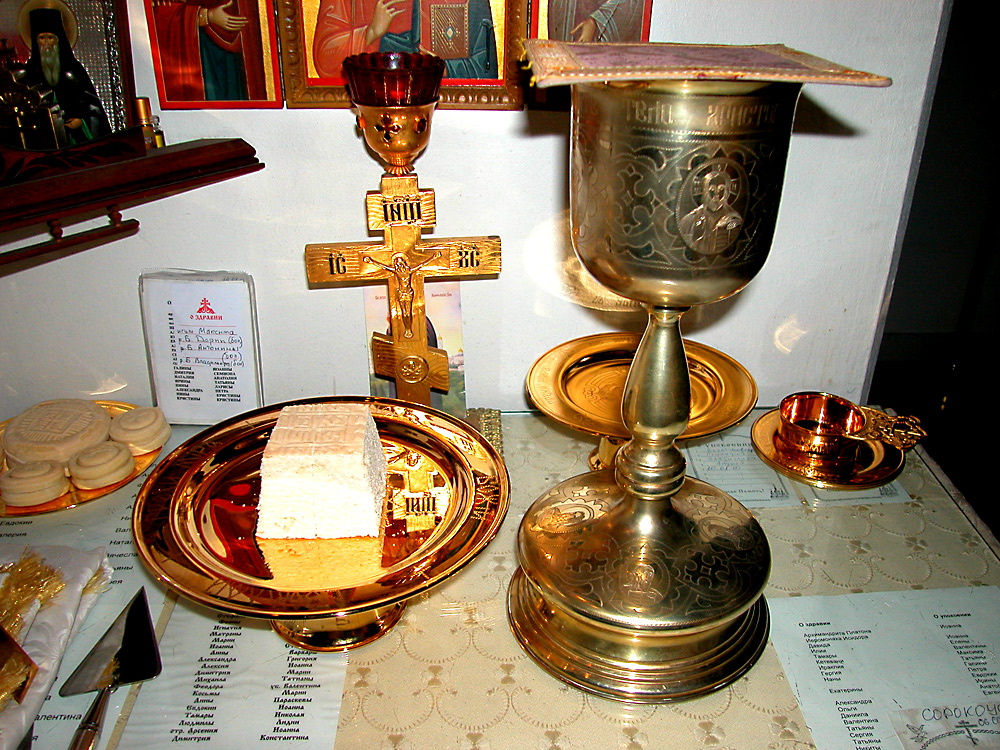
Vasa Sacra in the Russian Orthodox Church in Düsseldorf

Vasa Sacra (Latin for "sacred vessels"; singular: vasum sacrum) is a term from the field of silversmithing. It includes the equipment used during Christian liturgy. Vasa sacra are mainly made of noble metals or other noble materials such as ivory. Sacral equipment is used especially in the administration of the sacraments in the Roman Catholic, Anglican, Old Catholic, Protestant and Eastern Orthodox churches.

== Protection ==
The vasa sacra are often valuable objects. Because of their proximity to the acts of worship, and sometimes also because of their origin and history, they are also of particular idealistic value to the faithful. In Germany the legal system takes this into account. For example, § 243 of the German Criminal Code (StGB) deals with rules about church theft, a particularly serious variety of theft. The state also provides increased protection for the so-called res sacrae (Latin for "sacred things"). These are sometimes public property, because religious communities can dedicate them as public property by an administrative act of the church.

== Examples ==
- Altar crosses
- Altar cruets
- Aquamaniles
- Aspergillums
- Asterisks
- Chalices
- The dikirion and trikirion
- Fistulas
- Patens
- Processional crosses
- Spoons
- Thuribles
- Vessels for the holy oils
