= Credence table =

Side table used in the celebration of the Eucharist

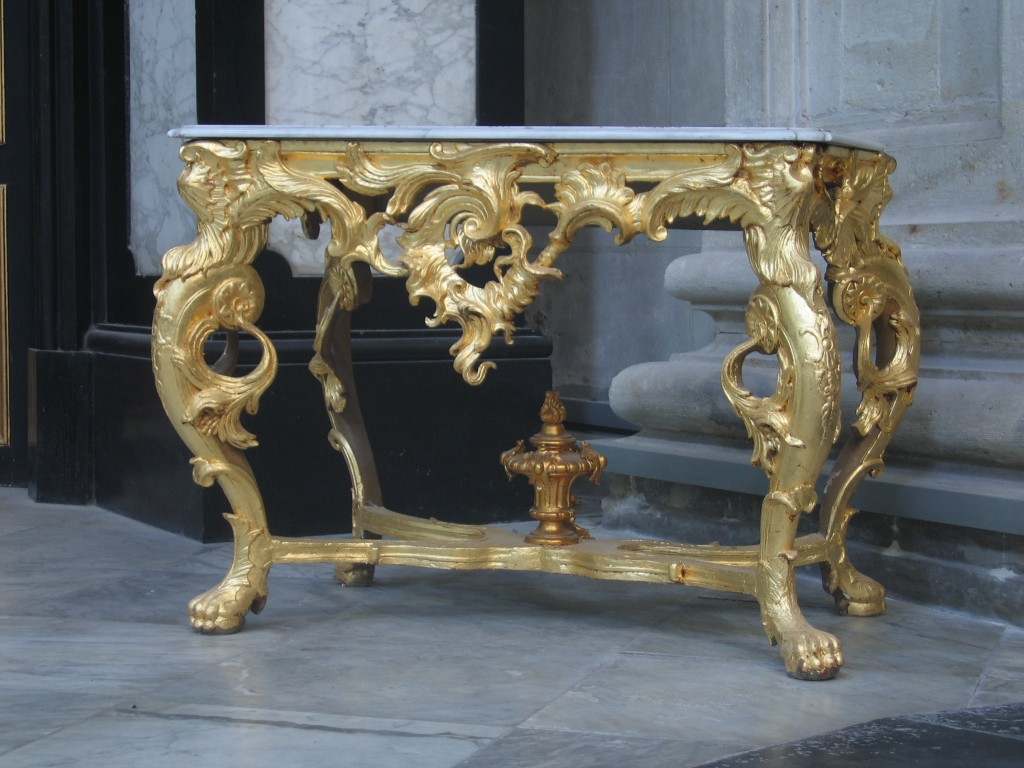
An elaborate Rococo credence table with marble top

A credence table is a small side table in the sanctuary of a Christian church which is used in the celebration of the Eucharist (Latin credens, -entis, believer).

The credence table is usually placed near the wall on the epistle (south) side of the sanctuary, and may be covered with a fine linen cloth. It is sometimes tended by an acolyte or altar server, and contains on it the implements that are used in the Eucharistic celebration, which may include the bread and wine prior to their consecration, a bowl, perforated spoon, ewer and towel for the lavabo and the ablutions after Holy Communion, etc. The wafers for the communion of the faithful may be stored in a ciborium, or host box (sometimes erroneously referred to as a pyx). The wine and water for the chalice will be in cruets. The chalice, and paten, covered with their cloths and veil (see chalice cloths for details) may be placed on the credence from the beginning of the service until the Offertory, at which time they are moved to the altar.

== Roman Catholic ==
In the Roman Rite Mass, the chalice and paten, covered with their cloths and veil (see chalice cloths for details) are to be placed on the credence table from the beginning of the service until the Offertory. At a Mass at which only one minister and no congregation assists, these vessels may instead be placed on the right (south) side of the altar. In the Low Mass form of Tridentine Mass, the priest placed them in the middle of the altar immediately before beginning Mass.

During the Offertory, the acolyte, deacon or priest places the sacred vessels on the altar. The wine and water are taken in their cruets to the altar to be poured into the chalice. After the altar has been incensed (if incense is used), two servers wash the priest's hands. The priest holds his hands over the lavabo bowl and the first server (if there are two) will pour water over the priest's hands; the second server then hands the priest the lavabo towel for him to dry his fingers. During the washing, the priest says some words from Psalm 25. When a bishop is celebrating Mass, a larger and more ornate basin and ewer may be used to wash his hands.

After Communion, when the priest or deacon consumes the remaining elements in the chalice(s), they are rinsed out and wiped, then replaced on the credence table and re-covered by the veil.

In very old churches, a niche in the wall served the purposes of the credence table.

== Anglican ==
In the Eucharist of the Anglican Communion the ritual regarding the use of the credence table varies from parish to parish and diocese to diocese. In some parishes, (typically those identifying as Anglo-Catholic) the ritual is quite elaborate, with an army of servers, a sub-deacon and deacon all taking part. In other parishes the chalice and paten may already be on the altar from the beginning of the service. Normally the server will bring the wine, water and wafers to the priest at the offertory, and then wash his or her hands.

== Lutheran ==
In the Lutheran church, the use of a credence table varies. While many Lutheran churches simply set up the Eucharist on the altar for the entire service, some churches, in order to show the distinction between the Service of the Word and the Service of the Sacrament will keep the altar clear of the sacramental vessels with the exception of the Chalice setting and appropriate Chalice Veil. The remaining vessels are stored on the credence table until the Offertory or offering when the celebrant pastor prepares the altar for the Sacrament.

== Eastern Catholic and Eastern Orthodox ==
The term credence table is not normally found in use within the Eastern Catholic Churches and Eastern Orthodox Churches. All of the items for the celebration of the Divine Liturgy are normally placed on the Table of Oblation. There is, however, an ancillary table on which other items, such as the lists containing the names of the faithful living and departed whom the priest will commemorate, will be placed. Other items, such as incense and a bowl and towel for the washing of hands may be there also.

== See also ==
- Analogion
- Credenza
- Prie-dieu
- Communion-plate
