= Communion-plate =

Liturgical object in the Catholic Church

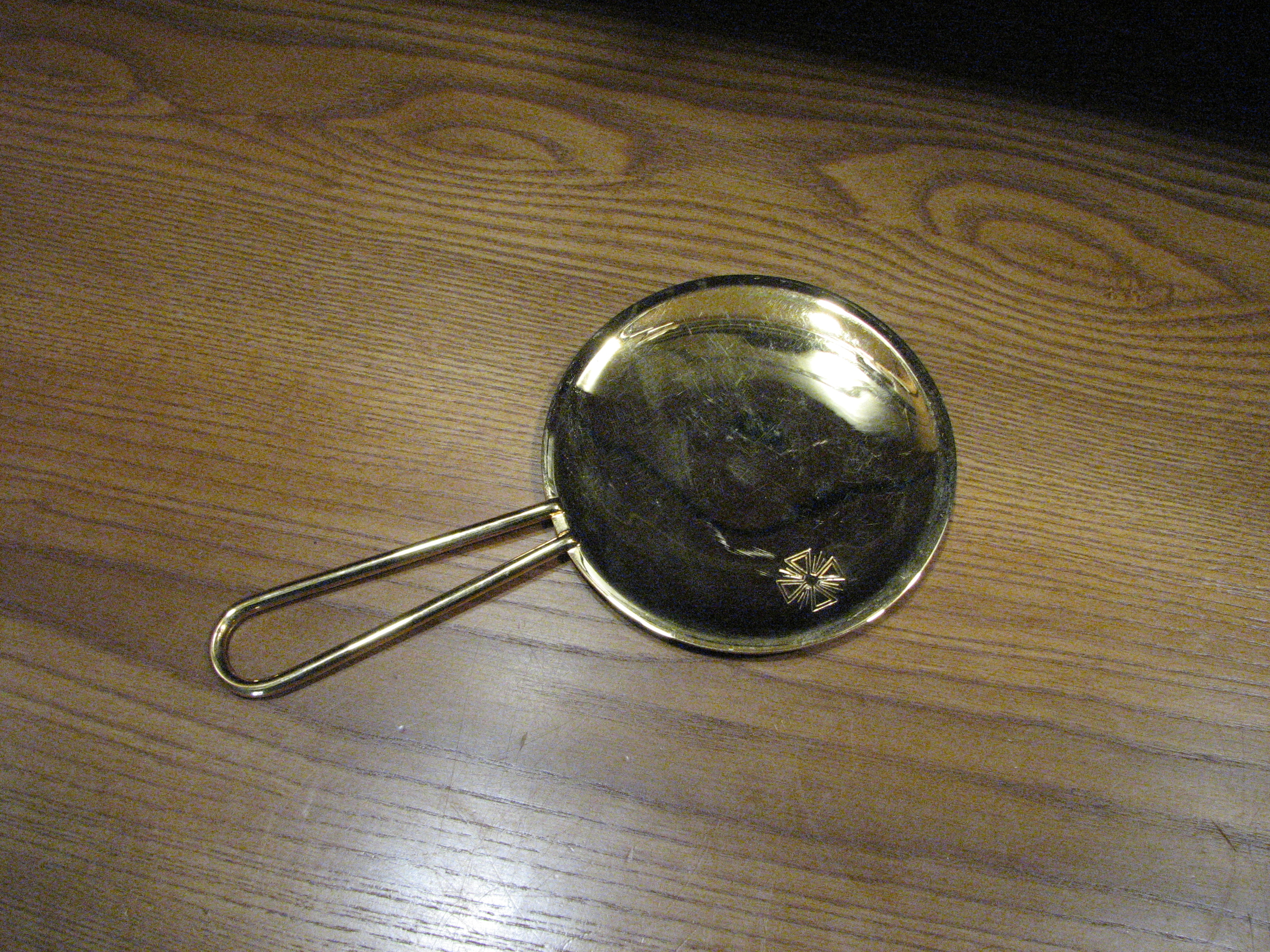
Communion-plate with handle for use by an altar server

A communion-plate is a metal plate held under the chin of a communicant while receiving Holy Communion in the Catholic Church. Its purpose is to catch any pieces of the host that might fall. Its use was common in the last part of the nineteenth century and during most of the twentieth.

== Terminology ==
The communion-plate is in Latin called patina, distinguishing it from the paten, which in Latin is called patena.

The Vatican-approved English translation of documents such as the General Instruction of the Roman Missal hyphenates the name. The two words are also written separately, as in the Oxford Dictionary of the Christian Church and in Bishop Peter John Elliott's Liturgical Question Box.

The unhyphenated term, "communion plate", has a more general meaning of eucharistic vessels plated with a precious metal, such as patens, chalices and ciboria.

"Communion plate" (unhyphenated) is also used for what is more commonly called a "communion tray", holding bread in the form of a loaf or cubes or crackers or holding small cups of wine or grape juice, which are passed along the pews in some Protestant churches since the close of the nineteenth century.

== History ==
The custom of holding a small communion-plate under the chin when receiving the sacred host arose in the mid-19th century, and became widespread after 16 March 1876, when in response to an enquiry about the new practice, the Sacred Congregation of Rites said it had no objection to it. On 26 March 1929 the Congregation for the Discipline of the Sacraments ordered its use by communicants, who were to hold it under their chin and then return it to the priest or pass it to the next communicant. In October of the following year, the same Congregation approved, in answer to a query, an alternative custom that had developed in some countries, in which the communion-plate was held under the communicant's chin, not by the communicant but by an altar server. The Congregation continued to require the use everywhere of a white linen cloth or veil stretched below the mouths of communicants, as prescribed by the Roman Missal. This has been called the communion cloth or the houseling cloth. A photograph of its continued use in 2013 within the sanctuary of a church appears in an online report on a priestly ordination in a Priestly Fraternity of Saint Peter church. It can also be attached to the altar rails.

In his 1960 Code of Rubrics, Pope John XXIII mentioned "the Communion plate for the faithful" (patina pro fidelium Communione) as one of the objects to be placed on the credence table before Mass. Two years later, he revised the Roman Missal, removing the rubric about the communion cloth and inserting a mention of the communion-plate, saying that the celebrant "puts into the chalice any fragments that may be found on the communion-plate that was placed under the chin of the communicants". That the communion-plate replaced the cloth is a view mentioned by Monsignor Charles Pope and others.

== Twenty-first century practice ==
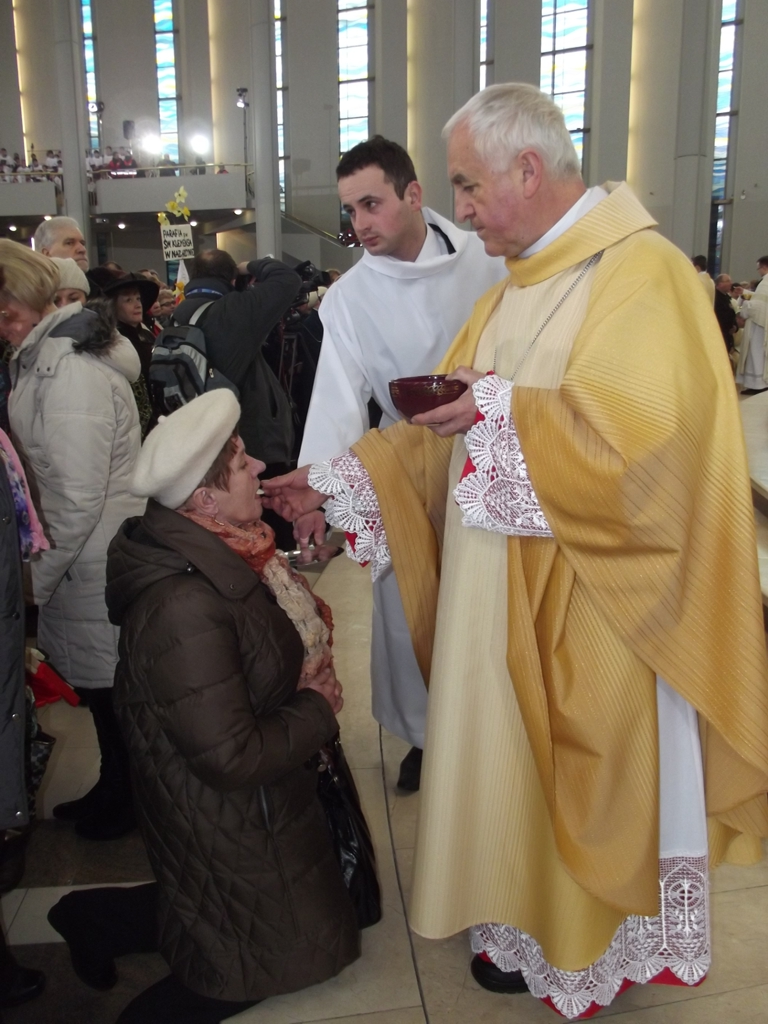
An altar server holds a communion-plate under the chin of a communicant, who receives the host on her tongue

The 2002 edition of the Roman Missal refers twice to the communion-plate: it retains the mention of it as an item to be placed on the credence table, and speaks of its use in administering Communion from the chalice by intinction to the faithful, who are to hold it themselves. The 2004 Instruction Redemptionis sacramentum says: "The Communion-plate for the Communion of the faithful should be retained, so as to avoid the danger of the sacred host or some fragment of it falling."

The organization Catholics United for the Faith says that use of the communion-plate is obligatory even where communion in the hand is authorized, and that it is held under the communicants' chin by an altar server, not by the communicants themselves.

However, since the liturgical books describe use of the communion-plate only in relation to intinction, Bishop Peter J. Elliott says that the prescription of the placing of a communion-plate on the credence table before Mass can be interpreted as meaning that this can be required only for a Mass in which intinction will be used: at other Masses use of a communion-plate is a licit option and cannot be forbidden, but is not obligatory.

Bishop Elliott says that the custom of using a communion-plate continues in some churches, "especially where the option for kneeling for Communion has been retained". One church has its altar servers (who are equipped also with towels) hold the communion-plates (which it calls "patens") under the chin of those who receive the host on the tongue and under the hands of those who receive it in their hands. Monsignor Charles Pope says that what he calls chin patens or communion patens "are always used in the Traditional Latin Mass [...] some parishes even use it in the Ordinary Form." The 2008 Oxford Dictionary of the Christian Church says that the communion-plate has become "obsolescent". The abbreviated Concise Oxford Dictionary of the Christian Church, published in 2013, speaks of the communion-plate as, "in the RC Church, a plate of silver or metal gilt formerly held under the chin of communicants as they received the Sacrament".

== See also ==
- Purificator
