= Aspergillum =

Liturgical implement used to sprinkle holy water

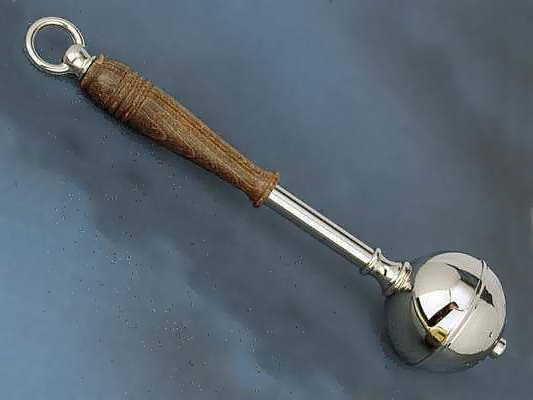
A Western-style aspergillum

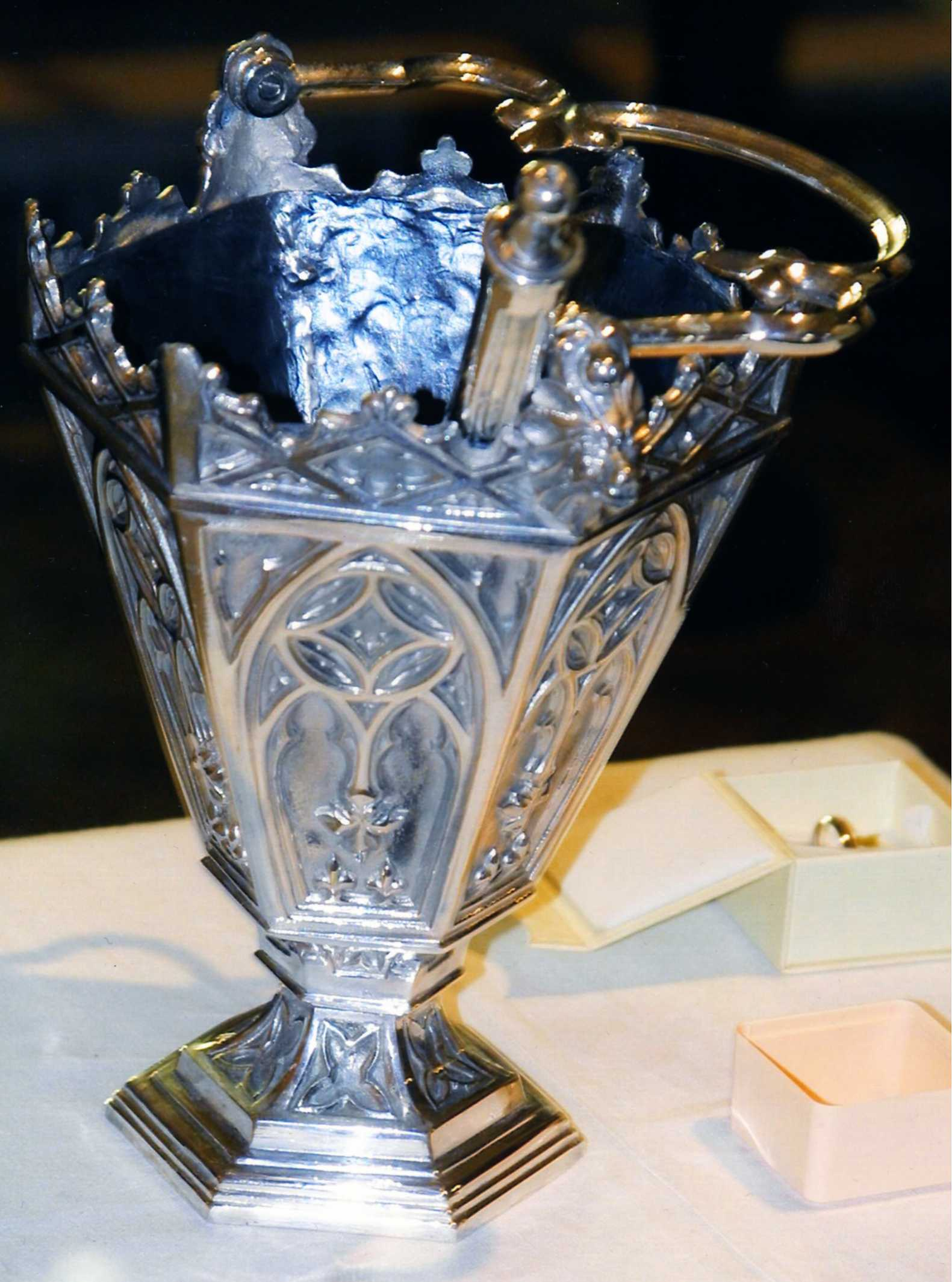
Aspergillum in a silver aspersorium or situla

An aspergillum ("little sprinkler", less commonly, aspergilium, aspergil or asperger) is a Christian liturgical implement used to sprinkle holy water. It comes in three forms: a freshly cut hyssop branch, a brush-like bundle that is dipped in the holy water and shaken, and a perforated, mace-like metal ball with a handle. Some have sponges or internal reservoirs that dispense holy water when shaken, while others must periodically be dipped in an aspersorium (holy water bucket, known to art historians as a situla).

== Uses ==
=== Christianity ===
An aspergillum is used in Roman Catholic, Lutheran and Anglican ceremonies, including the Rite of Baptism and during the Easter Season. In addition, a priest will use the aspergillum to bless the candles during Candlemas services and the palms during Palm Sunday Mass. At a requiem, if a coffin is present, the priest will sprinkle holy water on the coffin. The aspergillum can be used in other manners where sprinkling of holy water is appropriate, as in a house blessing, in which the priest might bless the entry to the home, during the Blessing of the Fleet, or as part of the ceremony consecrating an altar and a church building. The priest holds the aspergillum in his right hand while an acolyte holds the aspersorium. The name derives from the Latin verb aspergere 'to sprinkle'.

The form of the aspergillum differs in the Eastern Orthodox Church. In the Greek Orthodox Church the aspergillum (randistirion) is in the form of a standing vessel with a tapering lid. The top of the lid has holes in it from which the agiasmos (holy water) is sprinkled. In the Russian Orthodox Church the aspergillum is in the form of a whisk made of cloth or hair. Sometimes, sprigs of basil are used to sprinkle holy water. In some of the Oriental Orthodox Churches, no aspergillum is used, but the priest will pour holy water into the palm of his right hand and throw it on the faithful.

=== Tamil Culture ===
An aspergillum is used to pour sacred water on guests and also throughout a wedding. It is also used to pour holy water on Hindu deities in temples.

== History ==
=== Origin ===
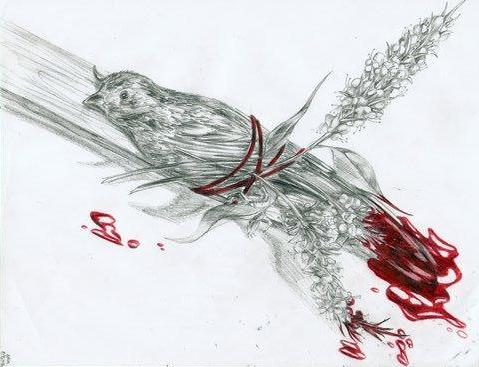
Proto-aspergillum as described in Leviticus

The origin is found in the Book of Leviticus Chapter 14 in the Old Testament:

And the priest goes out of the camp and the priest looks, and beholds that the sore of the leprosy of the leper is healed. And the priest commands, and takes, for the one healed, two unblemished live birds, cedar wood, Coccus scarlet, and hyssop. And the priest commands, and slaughters the one bird in a pottery vessel upon living water. He takes the live bird and the cedar wood and the Coccus scarlet and the hyssop and dips them and the live bird in the blood of the bird slaughtered upon the living water. And sprinkle seven times upon him purified of leprosy, and he is purified, and sends the live bird upon the face of the field.

Adam Clarke's commentary:

Of the cedar wood, hyssop, clean bird, and scarlet wool or fillet, were made an aspergillum, or instrument to sprinkle with. The cedarwood served for the handle, the hyssop and living bird were attached to it, by means of the scarlet wool or crimson fillet. The bird was so bound to this handle, as that its tail should be downwards, in order to be dipped in the blood of the bird that had been killed. The whole of this made an instrument for the sprinkling of this blood, and when this business was done, the living bird was let loose, and permitted to go whithersoever it would.

Clarke again, of Verse 5:

Over running water – Literally "living", that is, spring water. The meaning appears to be this; some water (about a quarter of a log, an egg shell and half full, according to the rabbis) was taken from a spring, and put in a clean earthen vessel, and they killed the bird over this water, that the blood might drop into it...

Further, these ceremonies conducted by the priest did not cure skin disease. According to Luke, the diseased person came to the priest after he had been healed (Luke 5:14). The task of the priest was to make the person who had been excluded from the camp, from his people, and from God, ceremonially clean. Through these ceremonial cleansings, which took place in two stages, a week apart, the diseased individual was restored to fellowship with God and with His people.

The procedure was a first stage of cleansing which took place outside the camp. The man washed himself and his clothes, and shaved. Two birds were taken. The blood of one was used to purify the man. The death of that bird portrayed the end of the man's old life outside the camp, and the flight to freedom of the other pictured his liberation from the effects of the disease. Then the man might enter the camp again.

=== Medieval Period ===
Since the 9th century it became tradition for the priest to sprinkle ("asperse") holy water on altar, worshippers, and the dead, in coffin or grave. During mass, this ceremony would take place before Holy Communion, usually accompanied by singing of psalm 51. For this, the priest would use either a sprig of hyssop in reference or the aspergillum would be dipped into the situla, a small bucket made of metals such as bronze, wood or ivory.

== Other uses ==
Aspergilla are also used in modern paganism, particularly to cleanse a ritual area in Wicca, as part of a spell, or during a Wheel of the Year festival in Neopagan witchcraft. Lunarized water, saltwater, or rainwater are most typically used.

Aspergillus, a genus of mold, was named in 1729 by the Italian priest and biologist Pietro Antonio Micheli. When viewed under a microscope, the mold cells were said to resemble an aspergillum.

== Gallery ==
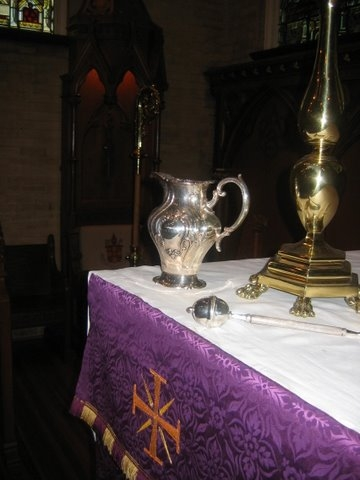
An aspergillum and silver ewer of holy water (Cathedral Church of Saint Matthew, Dallas, Texas)

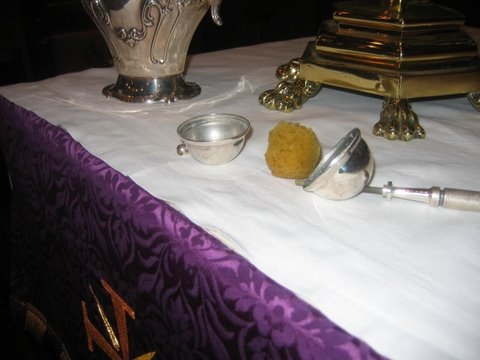
Aspergillum opened to show the sponge that is inside

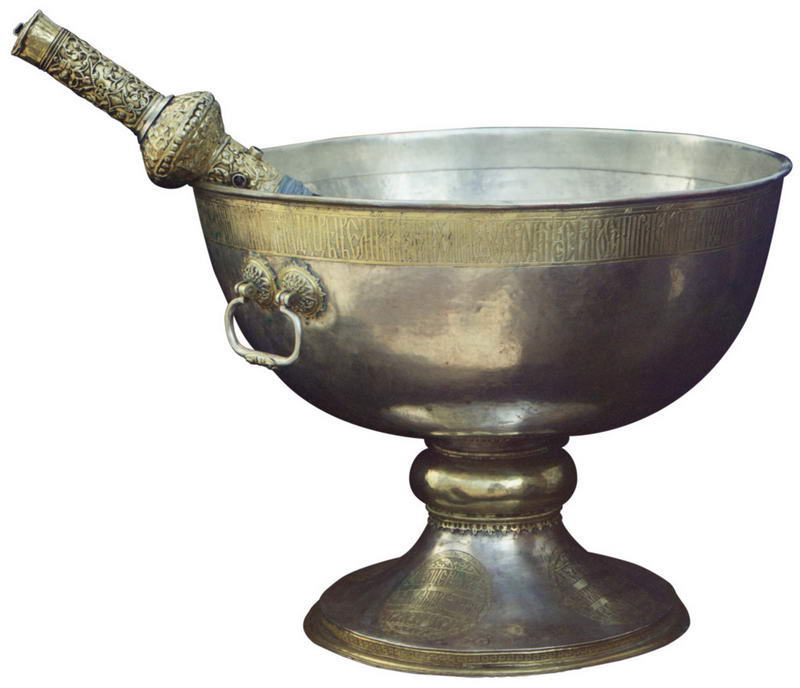
Vessel for holy water, with aspergillum, donation of Tsar Mikhail I Fyodorovich of Russia (Moscow, photo by Sergey Prokudin-Gorsky)

== See also ==
- Altar cruet
- Ciborium (container)
- Paten
- Pyx
- Stole (vestment)
