= Ciborium =

Ciborium may refer to:

- Ciborium (container), normally a covered cup for holding hosts from the Christian eucharist, or a shape of Ancient Greek cup
- Ciborium (architecture), normally a canopy-like structure built over the altar of a Christian church
