= Lunette (liturgy) =

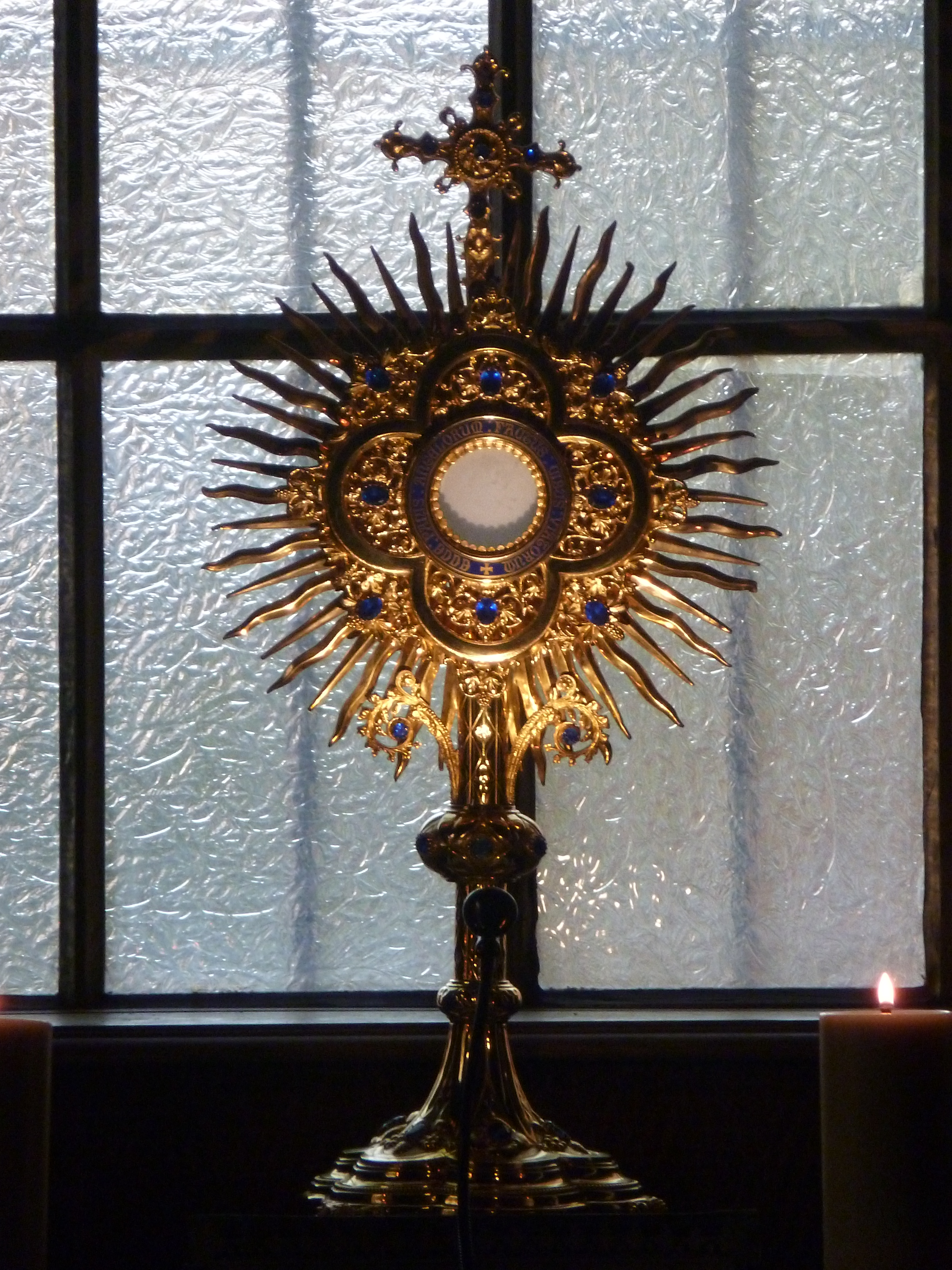
A monstrance, showing the space for a lunette at the centre

A lunette, also referred to as a luna or lunula, is an liturgical item used by in the Catholic Church for the exposition of the Host.

== Description ==
The lunette can take various forms. One is that of a flat, circular container, composed of a ring of metal (usually lined with gold) faced with a glass or crystal disc, (Note: This form of lunette commonly has glass both front and back (see Catholic Encyclopaedia 1913), though a statement in 1871 by the Sacred Congregation of Rites decreed that the lunette should have a metal back, with glass at the front only.(see Walsh).) which creates a round, flat, glass-enclosed space for the Eucharistic Host. This is used for exposition and Benediction services.

Another form is that of a crescent- or ring-shaped clip made of gold, often on a small stand, serving to hold the Host upright.

The lunette, containing the consecrated Host, is placed in the centre of a vessel known as a monstrance, or ostensory, which can be mounted or carried within the church. The lunette is often kept in another object when not on display, sometimes called a lunette or lunula case, which is usually a round box often on a small stand, serving to hold the Host upright.

The lunette resembles another liturgical object, the pyx or carrying case, but their functions are distinct; the pyx serves to transport the Host outside the church in order to take communion to an alternate venue, while the lunette remains within the church and serves to display the Host to onlookers. All of these objects, whenever they contain a consecrated host, are normally kept within the church tabernacle when they are not in use. The tabernacle may be behind the main altar, at a side altar, or within a special Eucharistic chapel.
