= Paten =

Small plate used to hold Eucharistic bread which is to be consecrated during the Mass

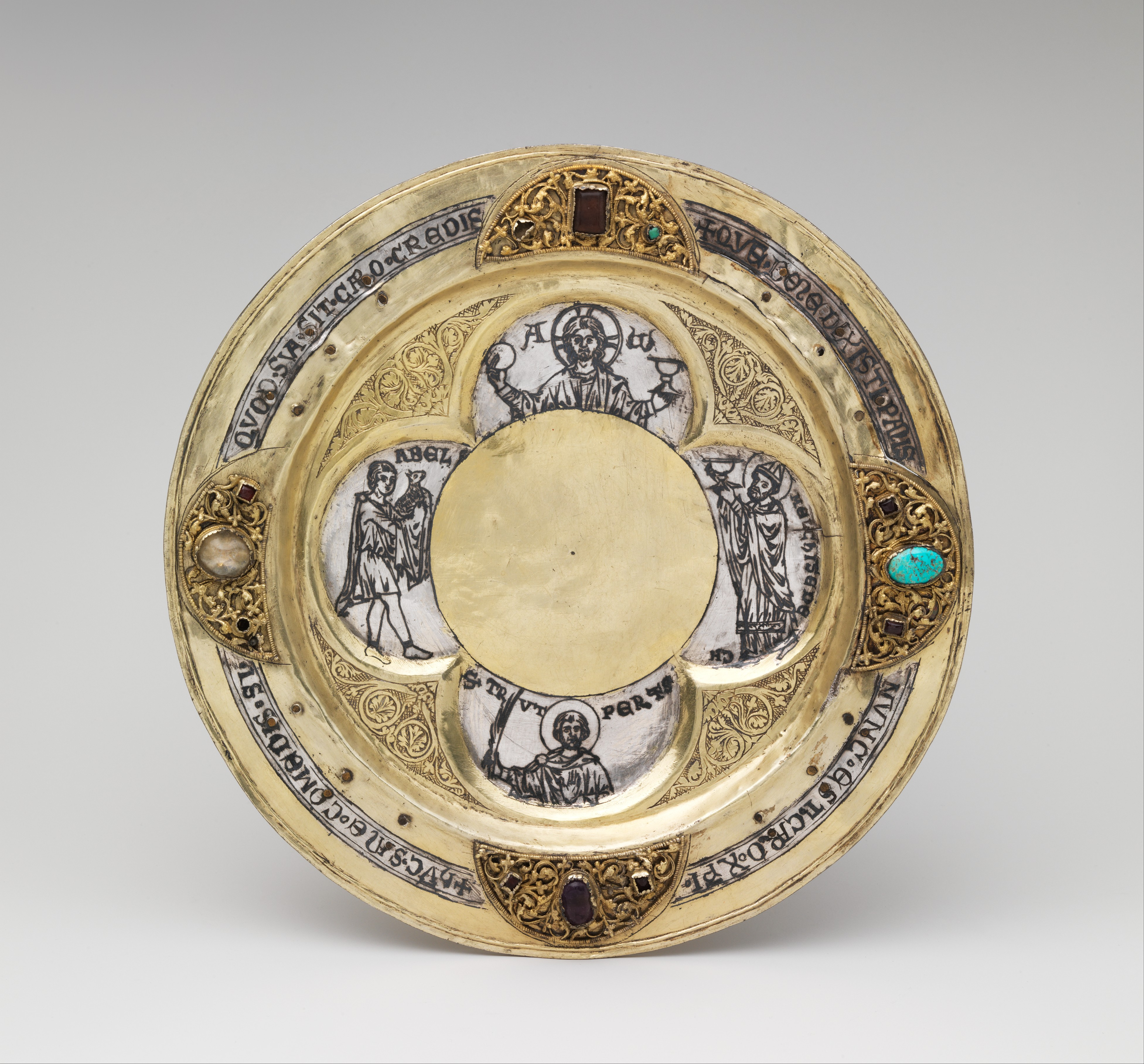
Paten, 13th century, now part of the Metropolitan Museum of Art Ensemble for the celebration of the Eucharist

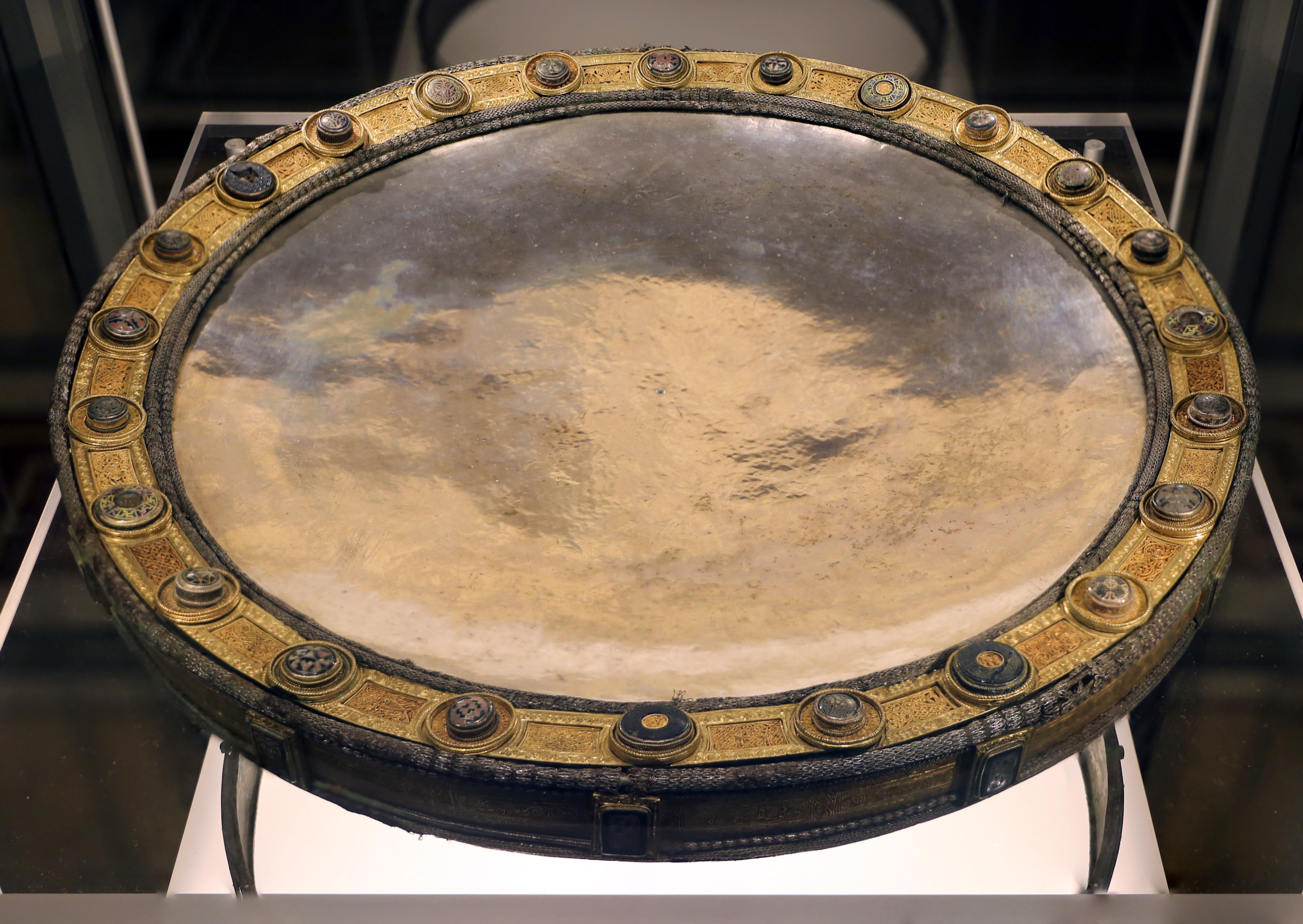
Derrynaflan Paten, part of an 8th- or 9th-century communion set found in County Tipperary, Ireland

A paten or diskos is a small plate used for the celebration of the Eucharist (as in a Mass). It is generally used during the liturgy itself, while the reserved sacraments are stored in the tabernacle in a ciborium.

== Western usage ==
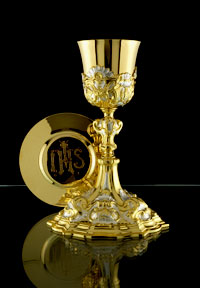
Traditional gold chalice and paten inscribed with IHS.

In many Western liturgical denominations, the paten is typically either a simple saucer-like plate or a low bowl. A smaller style paten will often have a depression that allows it to securely sit on top of the chalice, as shown in the illustration on the left here. It is common for both a paten and chalice to be fashioned as a matching pair.

=== Roman rite ===
The General Instruction of the Roman Missal lays down rules for patens:

Sacred vessels should be made from precious metal. If they are made from metal that rusts or from a metal less precious than gold, they should generally be gilded on the inside.

However, provisions for vessels made from non-precious metals are made as well, provided they are "made from other solid materials which in the common estimation in each region are considered precious or noble."

Some call the communion-plate a "paten", but the English translation of the General Instruction of the Roman Missal approved by the English-speaking episcopal conferences and confirmed by the Holy See uses "communion-plate" to speak of this object (numbers 118 and 187) and reserves the term "paten" for the other object (numbers 84, 117, 141, etc.). The two corresponding Latin terms are patina (communion-plate) and patena (paten).

=== Protestant rites ===
Patens are also used among Anglicans and Lutherans.

In the United Methodist Church, during the Order for the Ordination of Elders, each elder receives a stole, along with a chalice and paten, from the bishop after the part of the liturgy in which the bishop lays his hands and prays over the ministerial candidates. This is because the newly ordained elders are now able to celebrate the Sacraments, such as Holy Communion. In the Methodist service of the Holy Communion, the bread is placed upon a paten during the offertory and once again after it consecrated, specifically following the fraction. The paten, along with the chalice, lies on the altar during the celebration of the Holy Eucharist.

== Eastern usage ==
=== Byzantine Rite ===
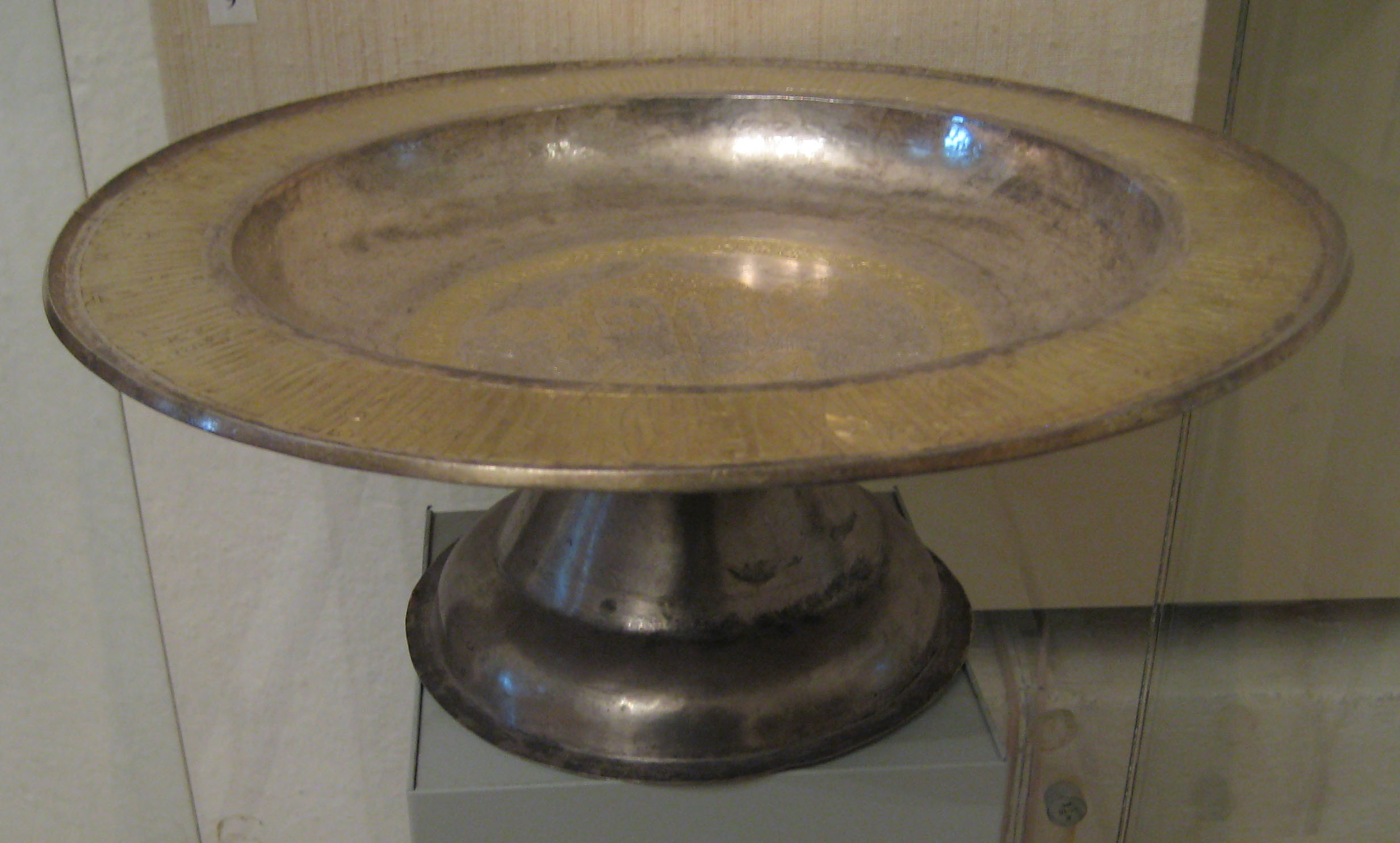
Gilded silver diskos (16th century, Pskov).

In the Byzantine Rite Eastern Orthodox and Byzantine Rite Catholic Churches, the paten is called a diskos and is elevated by a stand (or "foot") permanently attached underneath. The diskos is usually more ornate than its Latin counterpart, and must always be made of gold or at least be gold-plated. The diskos may be engraved with an icon of Jesus Christ, the Nativity of Christ, the Cross, or most frequently the Theotokos.

When a diskos is made, it is usually accompanied by a matching asterisk (small, folding metal stand used to keep the Aër from disturbing the particles on the diskos), a spoon (for distributing Holy Communion to the faithful), and a spear (used to cut the Lamb during the Liturgy of Preparation).

For Christians of historically Eastern church families, the diskos symbolises the Ever-virgin Mary, who received God the Word into her womb and gave birth to him, as well as the Tomb of Christ, which received his body after the Crucifixion and from which he resurrected.

==== Divine Liturgy ====
During the Divine Liturgy it is not only the Lamb (Host) that is placed on the diskos, but also particles to commemorate the Theotokos, the Saints, the living and the departed. Thus, on the diskos is represented the entire Church: the Church Militant and the Church Triumphant, arrayed around Christ. At the Great Entrance the deacon carries the Diskos, holding the foot of the diskos at his forehead. He then kneels at the side of the Holy Table, and the priest takes the diskos from him and places it on the Antimension. During the Anaphora, only the Lamb is consecrated.

At Holy Communion, the clergy partake of their portions of the Lamb directly from the diskos, but for the Communion of the faithful, the remainder of the Lamb is cut into smaller portions and placed into the chalice, from which the priest distributes Communion using the spoon. After Communion, the Deacon holds the diskos above the holy chalice and recites hymns of the Resurrection. Then, he wipes the remaining particles (for the saints, the living, and the departed) into the chalice saying the words:

"Wash away, O Lord, the sins of all those here commemorated, by Thy precious Blood, through the prayers of all Thy saints."

Sometimes, when a bishop celebrates the Liturgy, a smaller diskos is prepared for him with a small prosphoron from which he takes particles to commemorate the living and the departed before the Great Entrance.

==== Other uses ====
During the Consecration of a Church, a diskos is used to hold the relics of the saints which will be sealed in the Holy Table and antimension by the bishop.

When a priest is ordained, a portion of the Lamb will be placed on a small diskos and given to him, as a sign of the Sacred Mysteries which are being entrusted to his care.

==== Blessing and handling ====
In the Russian tradition, there is a special liturgy of blessing used to sanctify a diskos before its first use at Liturgy. The diskos may be blessed separately or together in a set with the other sacred vessels. The blessing is normally done immediately before beginning of the Liturgy of Preparation, after which the priest carries the diskos into the sanctuary and begins the liturgy, using the newly blessed vessel in that Liturgy.

Up until the first time a diskos is used in the Divine Liturgy it is considered to be an ordinary vessel, and may be touched by anyone. However, after having been used in the Divine Liturgy, a diskos may be touched only by a deacon, priest or bishop. A subdeacon may touch the sacred vessels, but only if they are securely wrapped in cloth.

When not in use, the chalice, diskos, and all the sacred vessels should remain on the Table of Oblation (prothesis), wrapped in their cloth bags—either sitting on top and covered with a cloth, or stored securely in a cabinet built into the prothesis.

=== Alexandrian Rite ===
In the usage of the Alexandrian Rite, the diskos usually has a flat bottom with no foot. Additionally, it has a raised edge, forming a relatively high rim, preventing particles of the offered elements from falling to the floor.

== See also ==
- Altar cruet
- Aspergillum
- Ciborium (container)
- Pyx
- Stole (vestment)

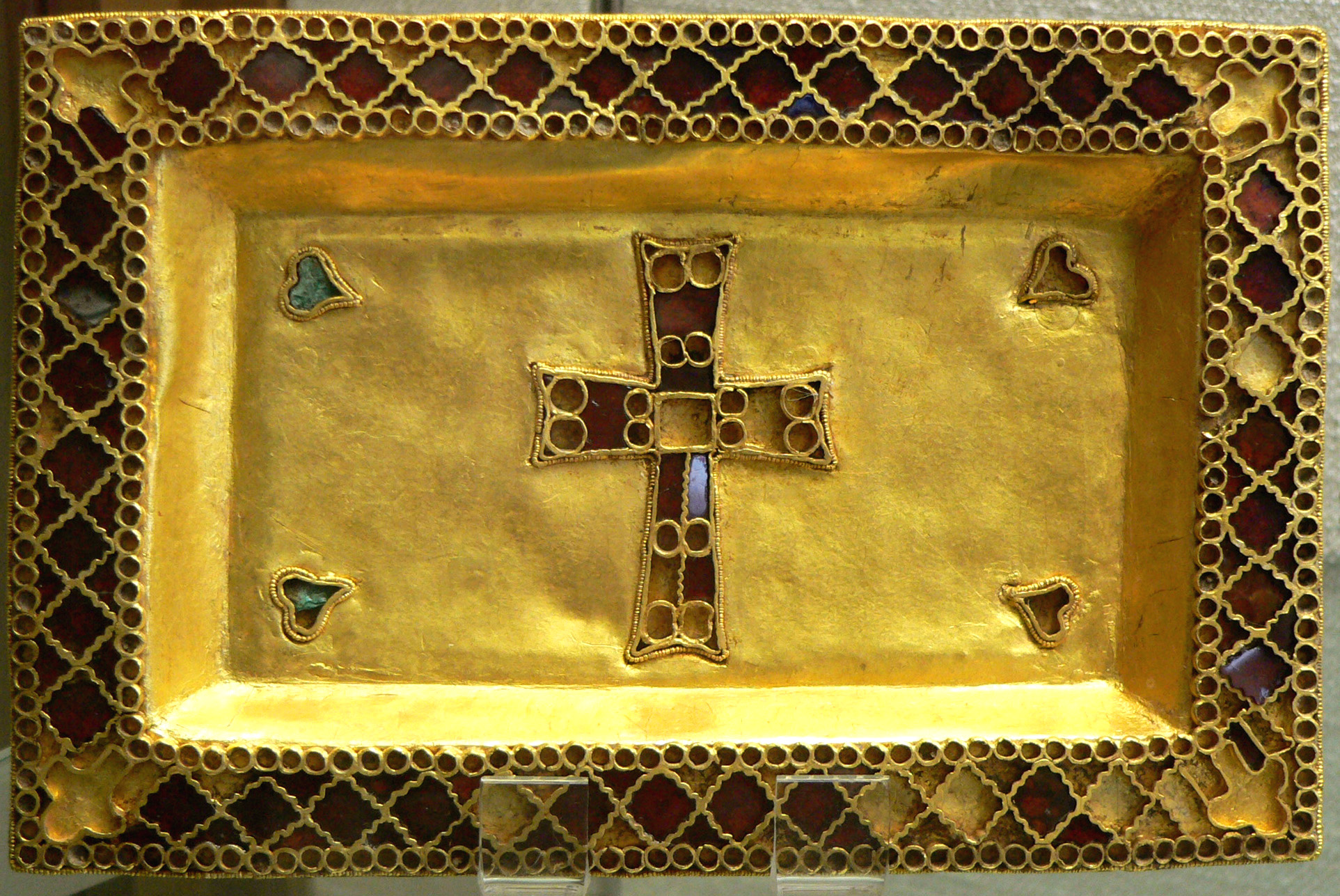
The paten from the Treasure of Gourdon (6th century)
