= Aquamanile =

Water vessel in the form of an animal or human figure

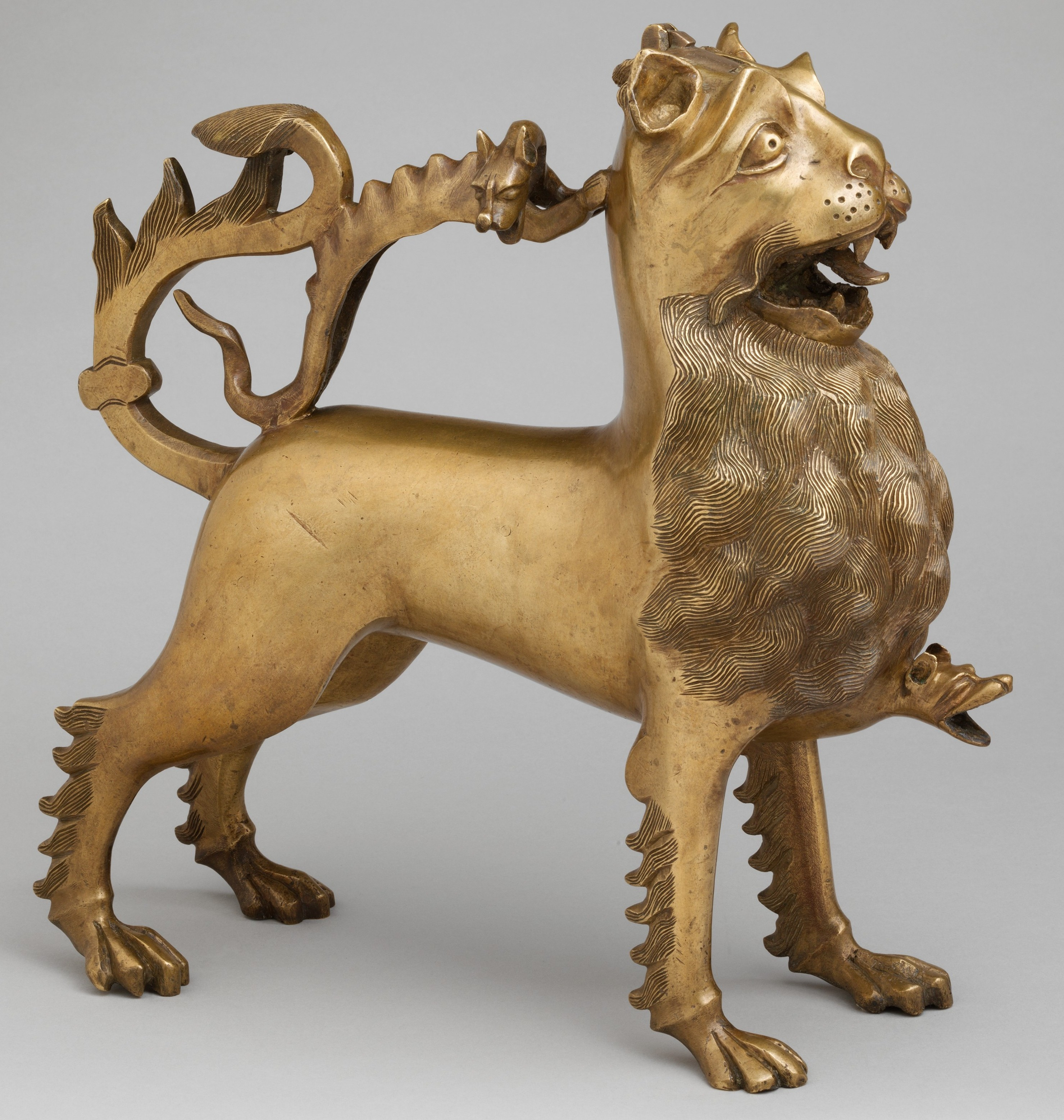
Aquamanile in the Form of a Lion

In modern usage, an aquamanile (plural aquamanilia or simply aquamaniles) is a ewer or jug-type vessel in the form of one or more animal or human figures. It usually contained water for the washing of hands (aqua + manos) over a basin, which was part of both upper-class meals and the Christian Eucharist. Historically (since the 6th century) the term was used for a basin used for priest's ablutions. The water was supplied by a subdeacon, and aquamanile was a symbol of subdeaconate. The term was later transferred onto secular ewers. Most surviving examples are in metal, typically copper alloys (brass or bronze), as pottery versions have rarely survived. Furthermore, although none can be seen in the present era, it is known that silver aquamaniles also existed in the Middle Ages.

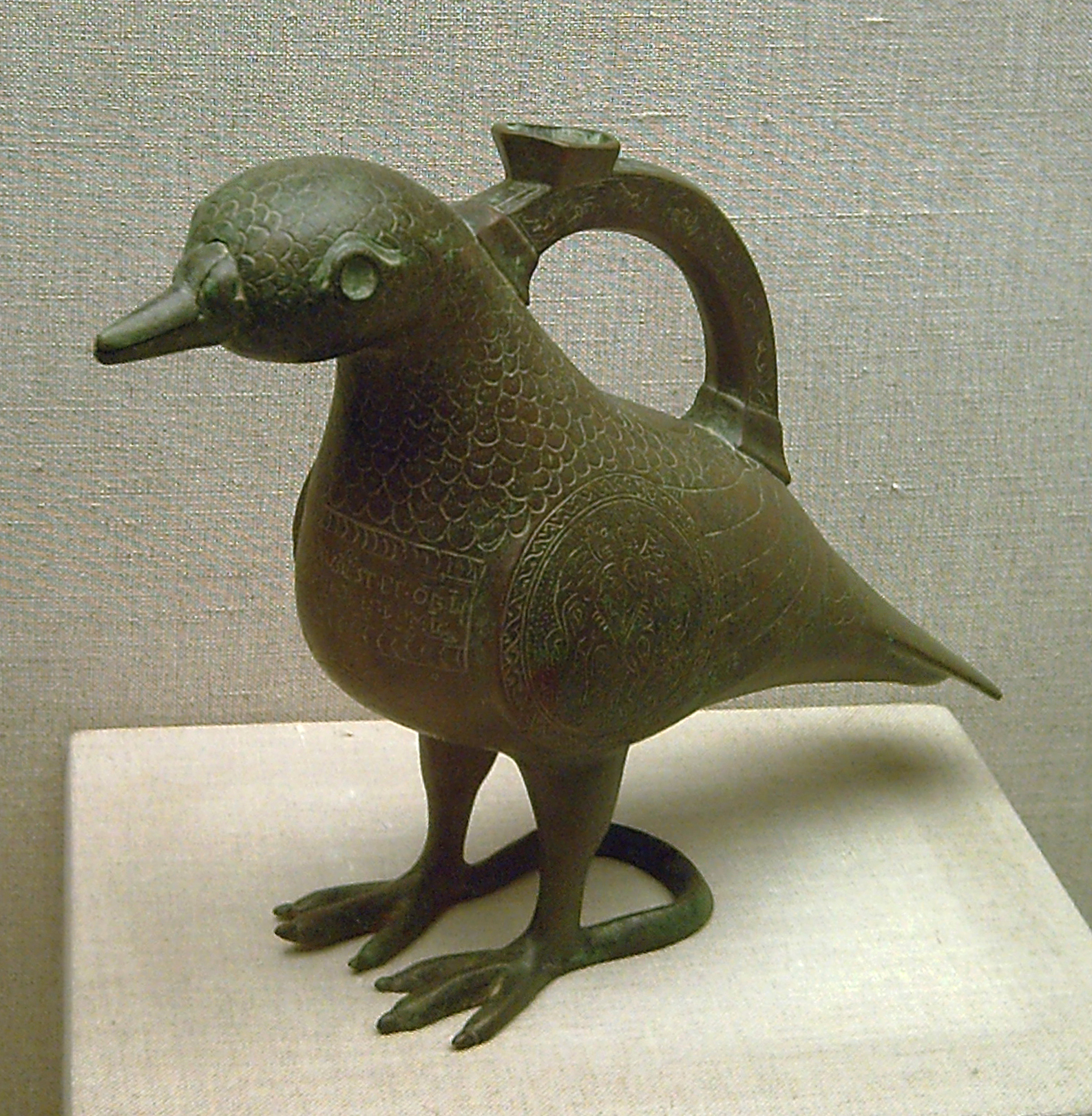
An 11–12th century Islamic aquamanile from Iran, later used in liturgy by Medieval Spanish Christians

== Islamic art ==
Persian aquamaniles predate any zoomorphic aquamaniles known in Europe. An Iranian (Abbasid caliphate), aquamanile in the form of an eagle, bearing the date 180 AH/CE 796-797 is the earliest dated Islamic object in metalwork. It is cast in bronze, inlaid with silver and copper, and can be found in the Hermitage Museum, St. Petersburg, Russia. The city of origin is unknown, as the inscription allows for a variety of interpretations. However, it is theorized that it was made in Iraq or Syria, due to the elaborate technique of decorative inlays that would only have been known to those areas at the time. It is possible that at one point, it was used as a weathervane, due to a hole between the feet; however, this has not been confirmed.

Among the latest in date is one also at the Hermitage, an Islamic aquamanile depicting a zebu and calf, from Khorasan dated 1206. This object is also a rare example of an Islamic automaton, as the (now lost) harness and bridle were movable, as well as the tail, and the bell wrapped around its neck would have rung when poured. The symbolism of the young lion on the top of the aquamanile has been subject to academic debate, due to academic disagreement as to whether the lion is attacking the zebu or suckling on its back. However, some suggest that it is a depiction of the young mythological king Fereydun and represents his slow ascent to kingship from his humble beginnings as a cattle breeder.

While Islamic law forbids the use of animal depictions in religious settings, and few examples of Islamic aquamaniles survive, it is believed that they were used to a great extent in the Islamic world. The inscription on the zebu and calf from Khorasan states that it was "cast in one," or, in other words, was cast using the lost-wax casting process. The complexity of the piece suggests that the artisans involved had accomplished such a technical feat many times before. Aquamanilia were often commissioned by the emerging Islamic upper middle class as a display of wealth. Despite their uniqueness and rarity, Islamic aquamanilia are understudied.

== Europe ==
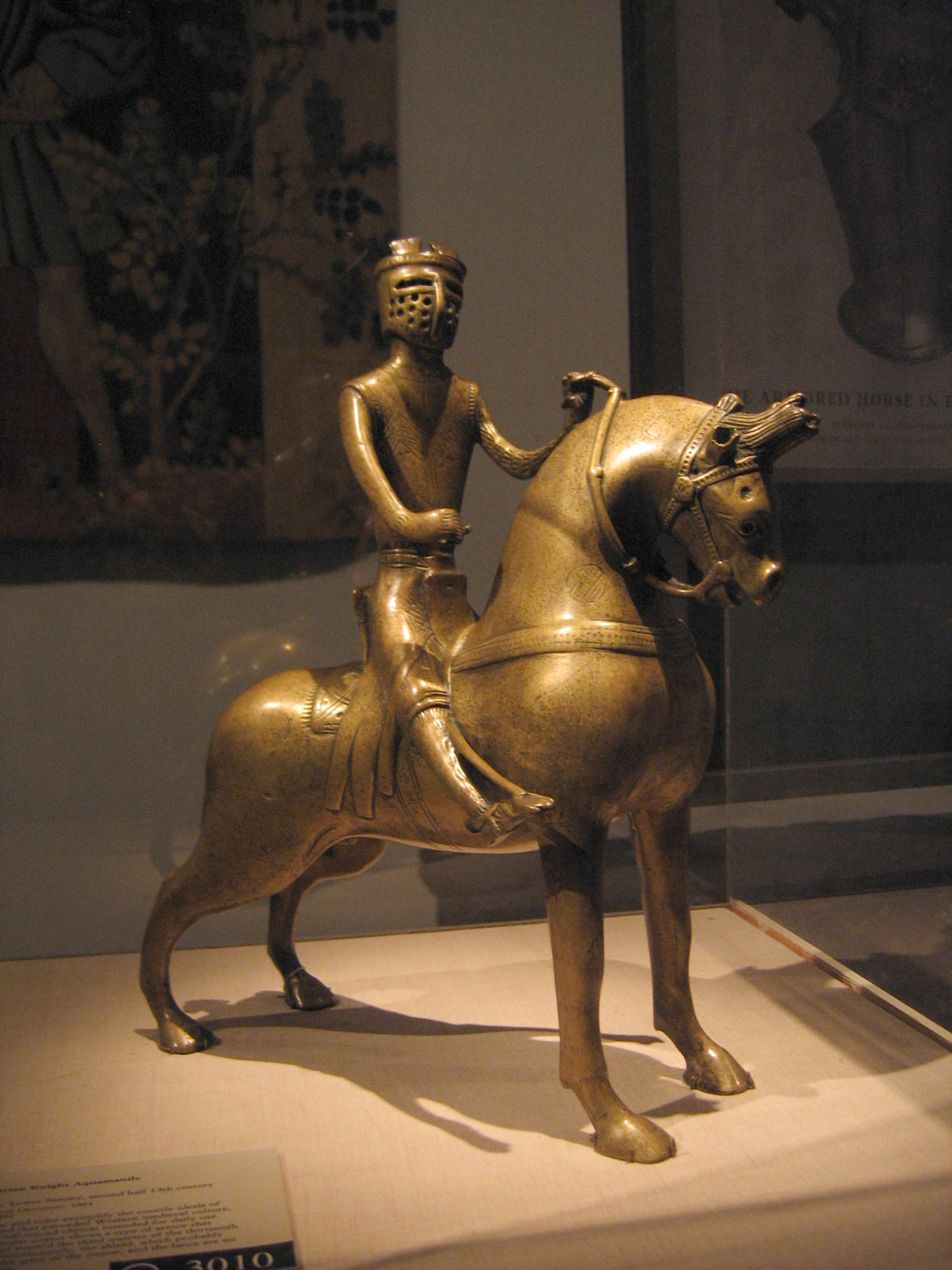
Bronze aquamanile in the form of a mounted knight, second half of the 13th century, Lower Saxony

The Byzantine Empire's cultural connections with Sassanid Persia and the Abbasid caliphate, never peaceful in the political sphere, nevertheless brought the aquamanile into the Christian Mediterranean world. The earliest European portable aquamaniles date to the eleventh century.

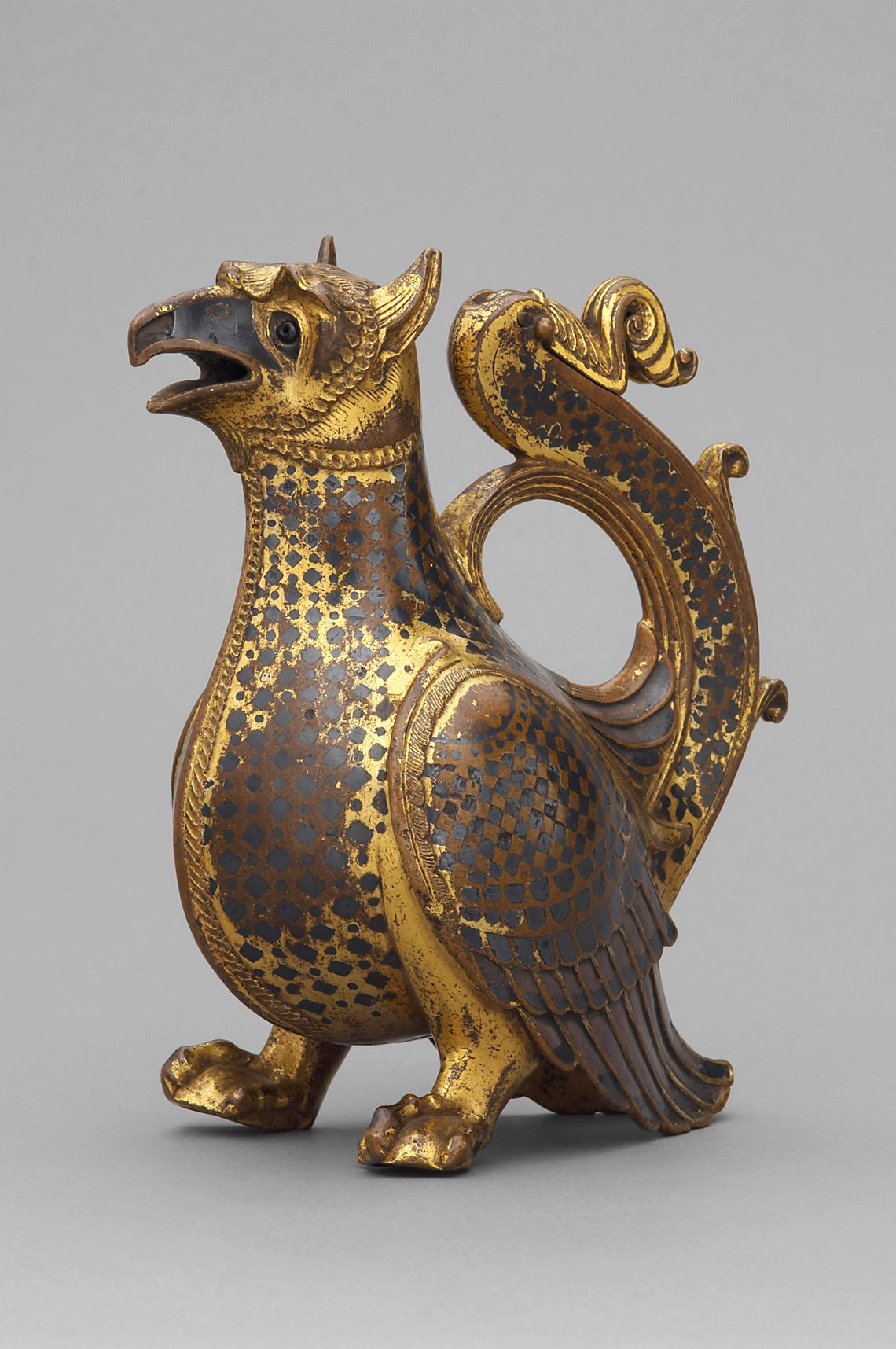
Aquamanile in the form of a Griffon, currently at the Kunsthistorisches Museum Wien.

Ewers and basins were needed in Christian liturgy for the ritual of the lavabo, in which the officiating priest washes his hands before vesting, again before the consecration of the Eucharist and after mass. As a ritual object, metal was considered more suitable than pottery, although most examples in pottery no doubt were broken and discarded. The aquamaniles made in the Mosan – or Meuse valley – region, using the brass alloy of silvery tint called dinanderie (from the center of its manufacture in the region of Dinant) were often fantastic and zoomorphic in their forms, which were constrained only by the need for a larger opening for filling the vessel and a spout for pouring. Church records inventory aquamaniles in silver or gilt copper, but the great majority of surviving examples are in base metals, which were not worth melting down.

As well as the altar, aquamaniles were used at the tables of the great, where extravagant designs of symbolic or fantastical beasts – lions were especially popular – were developed in purely secular iconography. In the Middle Ages, people regarded the lion as a creature of such nobility that it was likened to Christ and a symbol of good strength. Although aquamaniles in the Christian liturgy were created in the form of snakes, human heads or busts, dragons, birds, and various other animals, because of these positive and noble impressions people held regarding lions, the lion was a special form for them.

A gold aquamanile, c. 1215, in the treasury of the cathedral at Aachen, takes the form of a man's bust; it is a rare survival of an aquamanile in a precious metal. An aquamanile (ref. Metropolitan Museum) in the form of Aristotle on hands and knees, being ridden by Phyllis, bore several moral lessons, with ribald undertones; such an aquamanile was distinctly secular in nature. From the 12th century through the latter half of the 16th century, aquamaniles became popular among people not only in religious settings but also in their everyday lives. People washed their hands after meals using aquamaniles both when they were home and away from home, such as at inns and banquets.

Bronze aquamaniles in the form of leopards were part of court ritual in Benin, where the concept may have arrived from the Islamic north. An 18th-century bronze leopard aquamanile from Benin is in the collection of the Minneapolis Institute of Arts.

From the Renaissance elaborate versions of the conventional ewer were preferred to zoomorphic forms. A late version of the aquamanile was the silver-gilt mounted rider on a stand, bought in 1700 for the treasury of the Basilica of St-Denis and sold in 1798. Its form is recorded in an engraving by Félibien. (ref. St-Denis) The idea of ewers in fantastic shapes has never died out.

== Examples ==
The following aquamanilia in collections are set in approximate chronological order:

- State Hermitage Museum, Aquamanile in the form of an eagle, signed by "Suleiman" dated 180 AH/796-797
- Victoria and Albert Museum, Aquamanile in the form of a griffin, ca. 1130
- Khalili Collection of Islamic Art, Aquamanile in the form of a goose, Khurasan, Iran, 12th century
- Khalili Collection of Islamic Art, Elephant aquamanile, Syria, 12th or early 13th century
- Museum für Kunst und Gewerbe Hamburg, Aquamanile in the form of a lion, ca. 1200
- National Gallery of Art, Washington, Aquamanile in the form of a lion, north French or Mosan, c. 1200
- State Hermitage Museum, Aquamanile of a cow with her calf, Khorasan, dated CE 1206; handle in the form of a lion, attacking the cow by the hump of its back.
- Khalili Collection of Islamic Art, Large aquamanile in the form of a feline, Iran or Afghanistan, early 13th century.
- National Gallery of Art, Washington, Aquamanile in the form of a horseman, English or Scandinavian, 13th century
- Rijksmuseum, Aquamanile in the form of a horse, bronze, Maas/Meuse region, 13th century
- Wartburg, Eisenach, Aquamanile in the form of a lion, 13th century
- Legion of Honor, San Francisco, Aquamanile of a lion, German, 13th century
- Harvard University Art Museums, Fogg Museum, Aquamanile (water vessel) in the form of a lion, 13th or 14th century
- Art Institute of Chicago, Aquamanile in the form of a lion, 1325–75
- Metropolitan Museum of Art, Aquamanile in the form of a mounted knight, bronze, Lower Saxony, late 13th century
- Walters Art Museum, Aquamanile in the Form of a Lion, brass, ca. 1300
- Rijksmuseum, Aquamanile in the form of a lion, last quarter of the 14th century
- Germanisches National Museum, Aquamanile in the form of a lion, ca. 1400
- Metropolitan Museum of Art, Aquamanile in the form of Aristotle and Phyllis, Lorraine, c. 1400
- The Cloisters Collection, Aquamanile in the form of a lion, copper alloy, Nuremberg, c. 1400
- Detroit Institute of Arts, Lion aquamanile, 1425–50
- The Hunt Museum, Horse Aquamanile, Germany, 15th century
- "The Treasure of Saint Denis"
- State Hermitage Museum, Aquamanile Shaped like a Rider from Augsburg, Germany, ca. 1665.

== Gallery ==
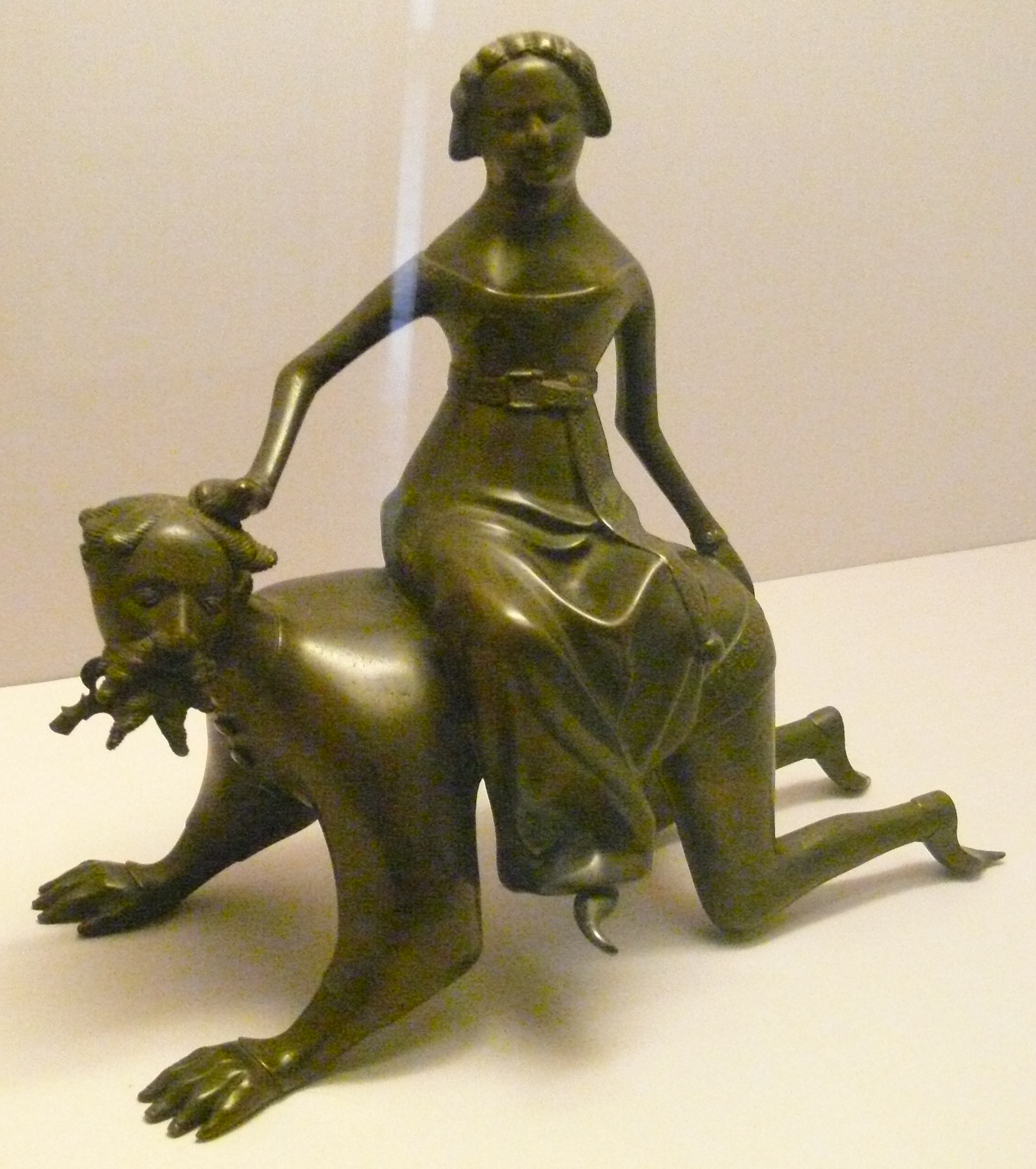
Aquamanile Aristotle and Phyllis (Musée Dobrée, Nantes, France)

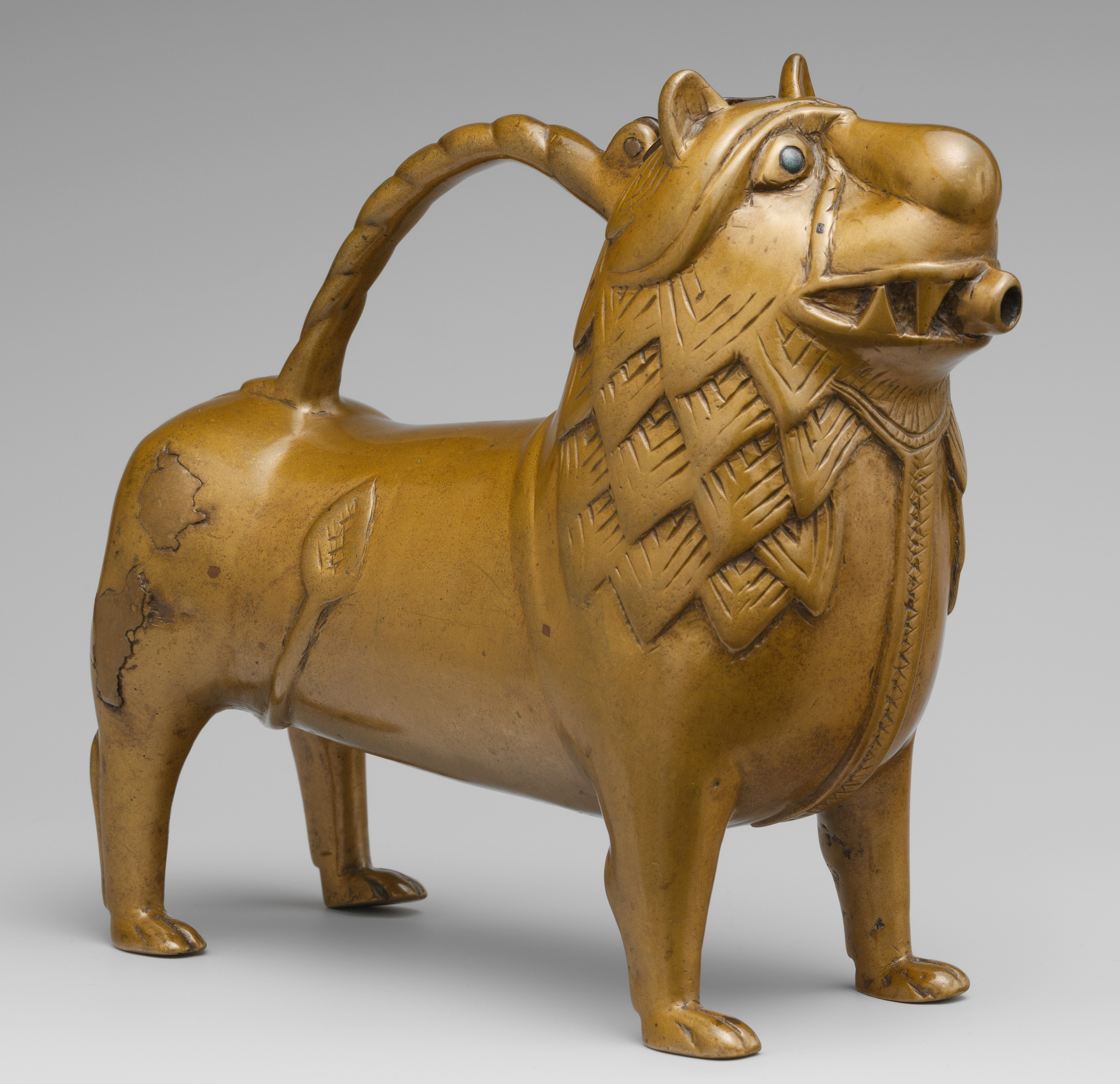
Aquamanile in the form of a lion, 12th century, made of copper alloy with glass inlays, overall: 19.5 x 21.9 x 8.7 cm, in the Metropolitan Museum of Art (New York City)

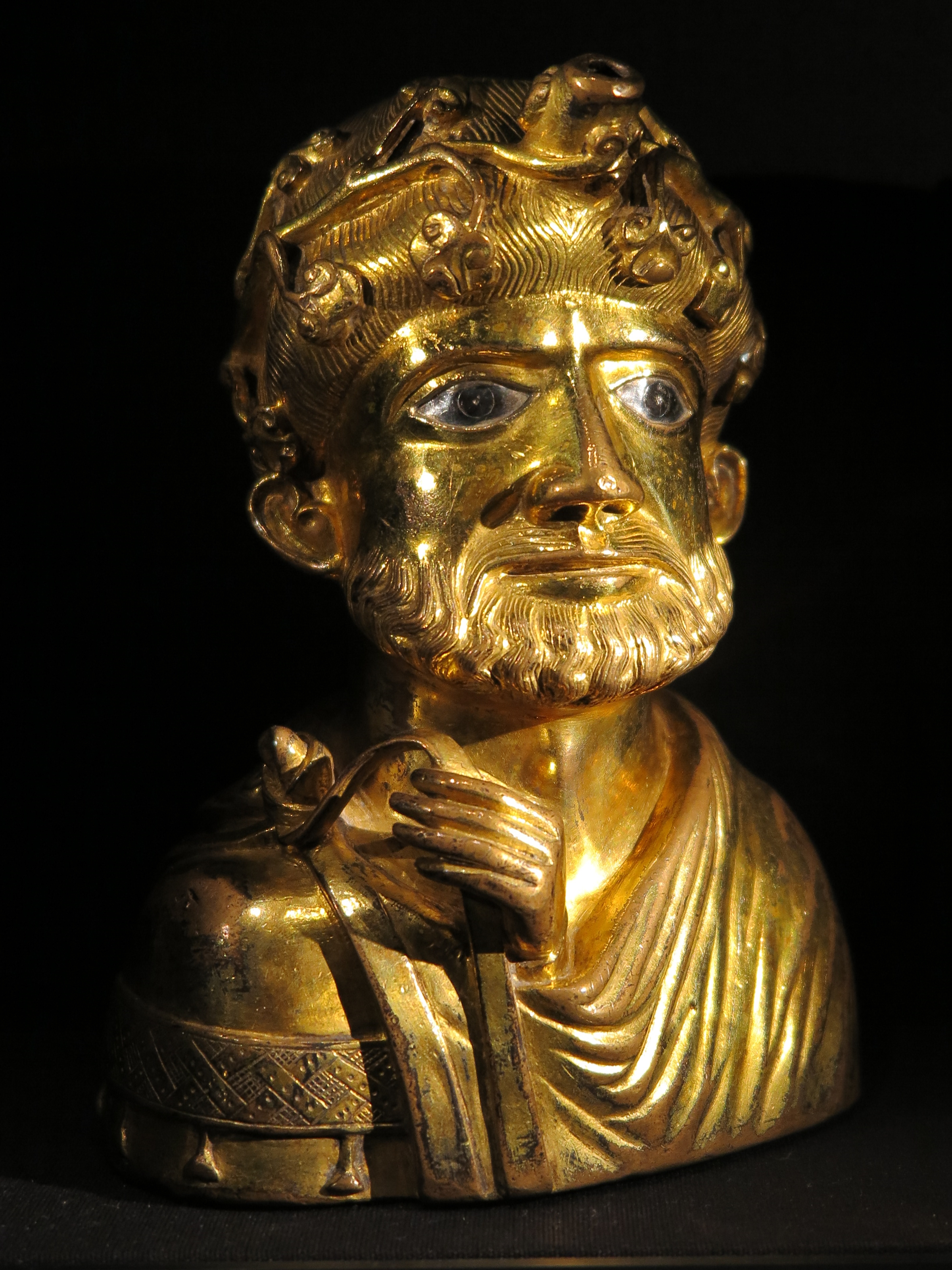
Aquamanile, about 1170/80, (Aachen Cathedral Treasury)

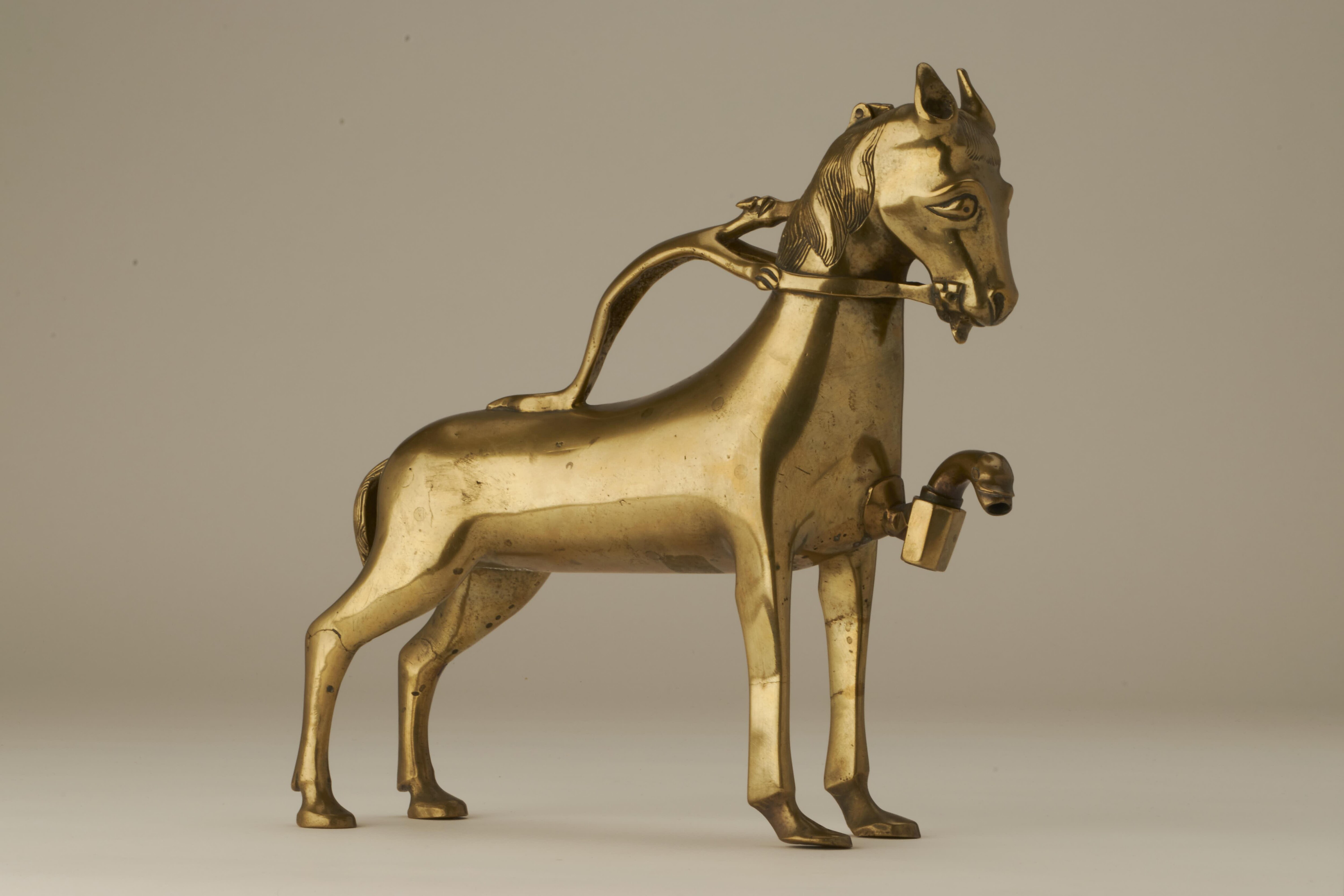
Aquamanile in the shape of a horse, brass, 15th century. The Hunt Museum (Limerick, Ireland)

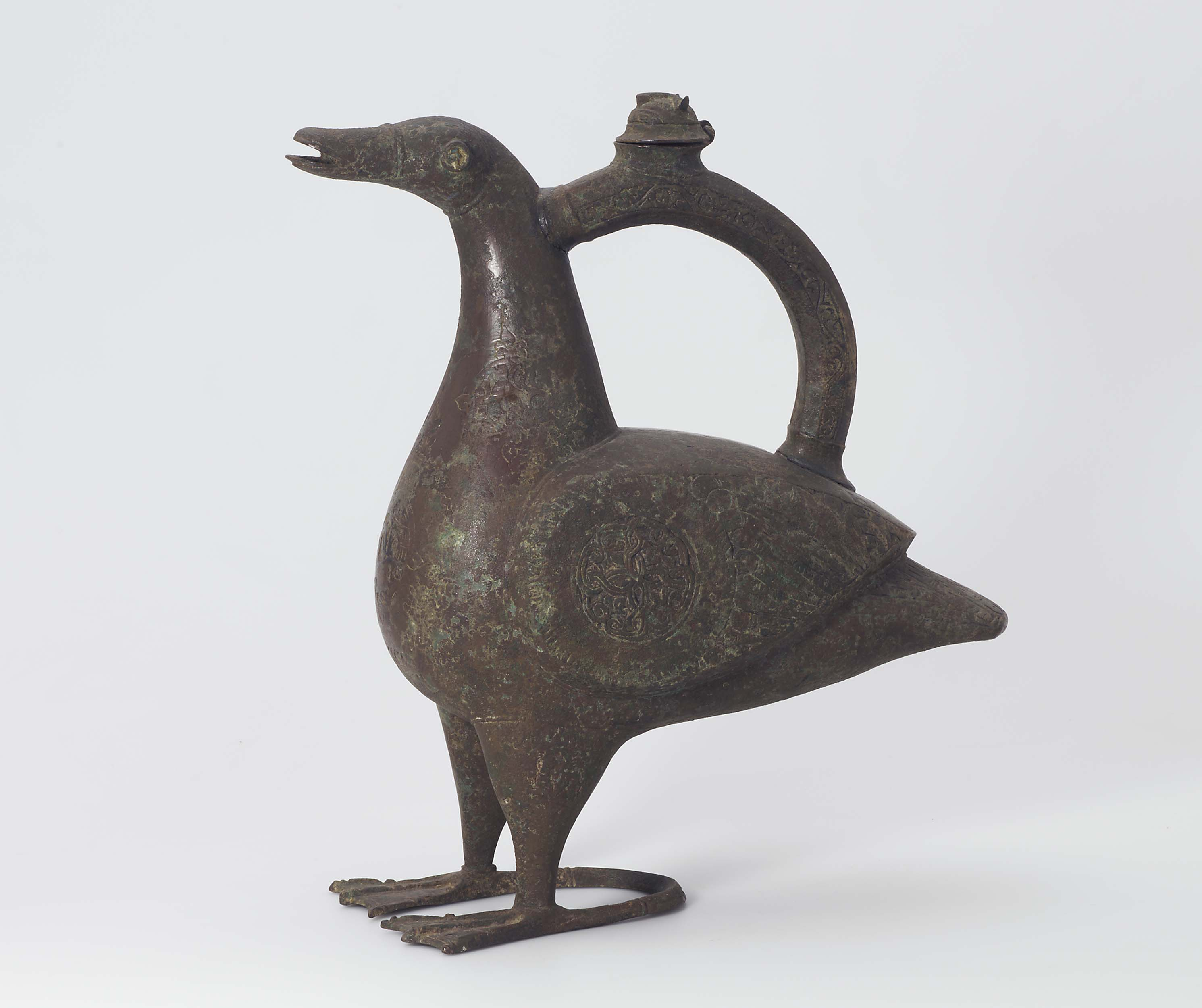
Aquamanile in the form of a goose, 12th century AD, Khalili Collections. Quaternary copper alloy with surface engraving and traces of black compound, the eyes inlaid with turquoise-glazed pottery

Winged griffin, Nuremberg, c. 1400, Louvre Museum.

== See also ==
- Altar cruet, a container for Communion wine.
- Bartmann jugs, also known as Bellarmine jubs, pottery jugs with bearded faces manufactured in Europe in 16th and 17th centuries.
- Toby jug, pottery jug in the form of a seated person, or the head.
- Cow creamer, ceramic or silver cream dispenser in the shape of a cow.
