= Altar cruet =

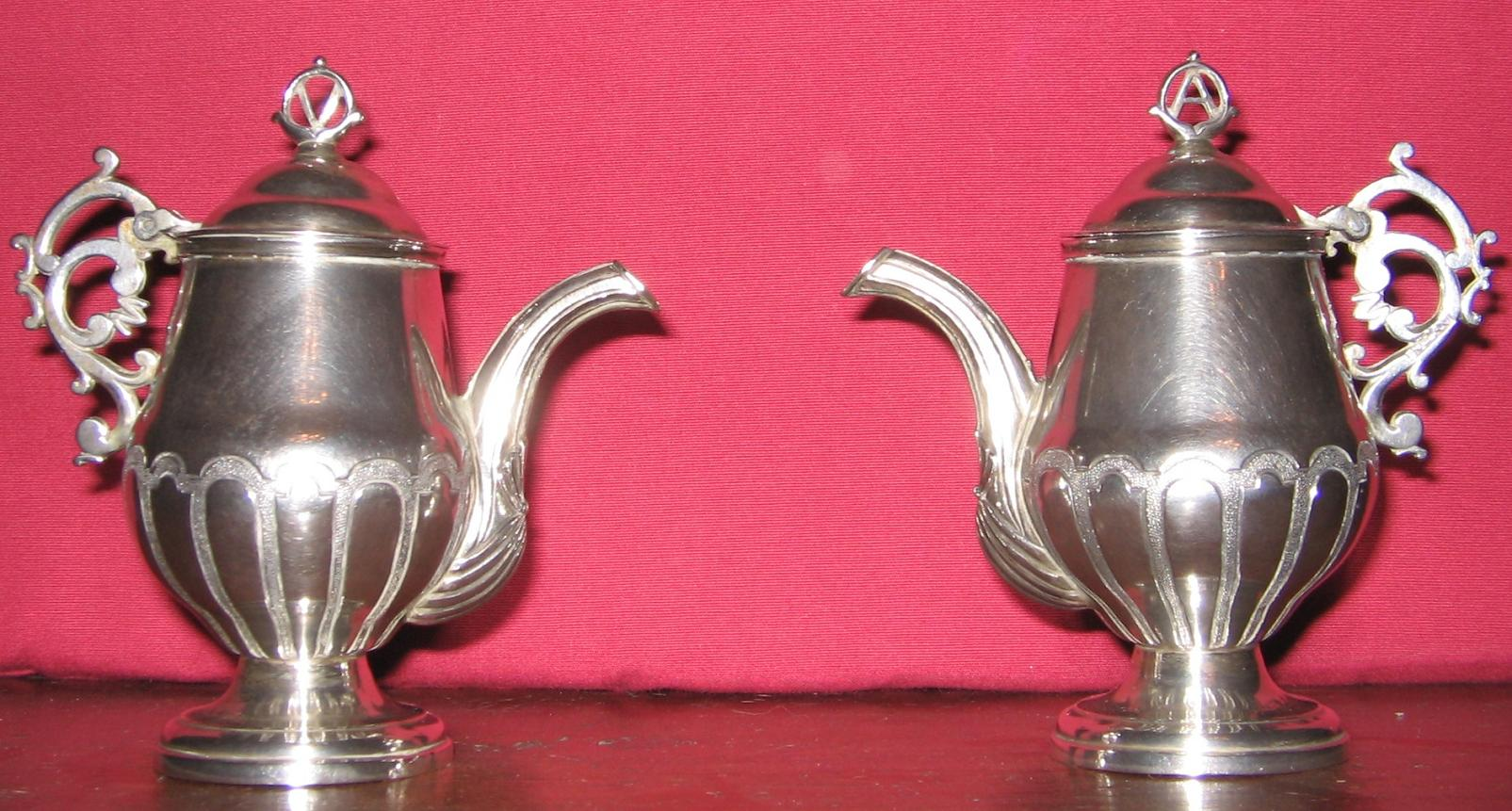
Altar cruets in San Pedro church (Ayerbe, Spain)

An altar cruet or mass cruet is a small jug used in mass to carry the water or wine that are used in the consecration.

The current cruets have replaced the old amphoras that, with the name of hama or amula, were used to receive and carry the chalices of the wine that the faithful offered at Mass.

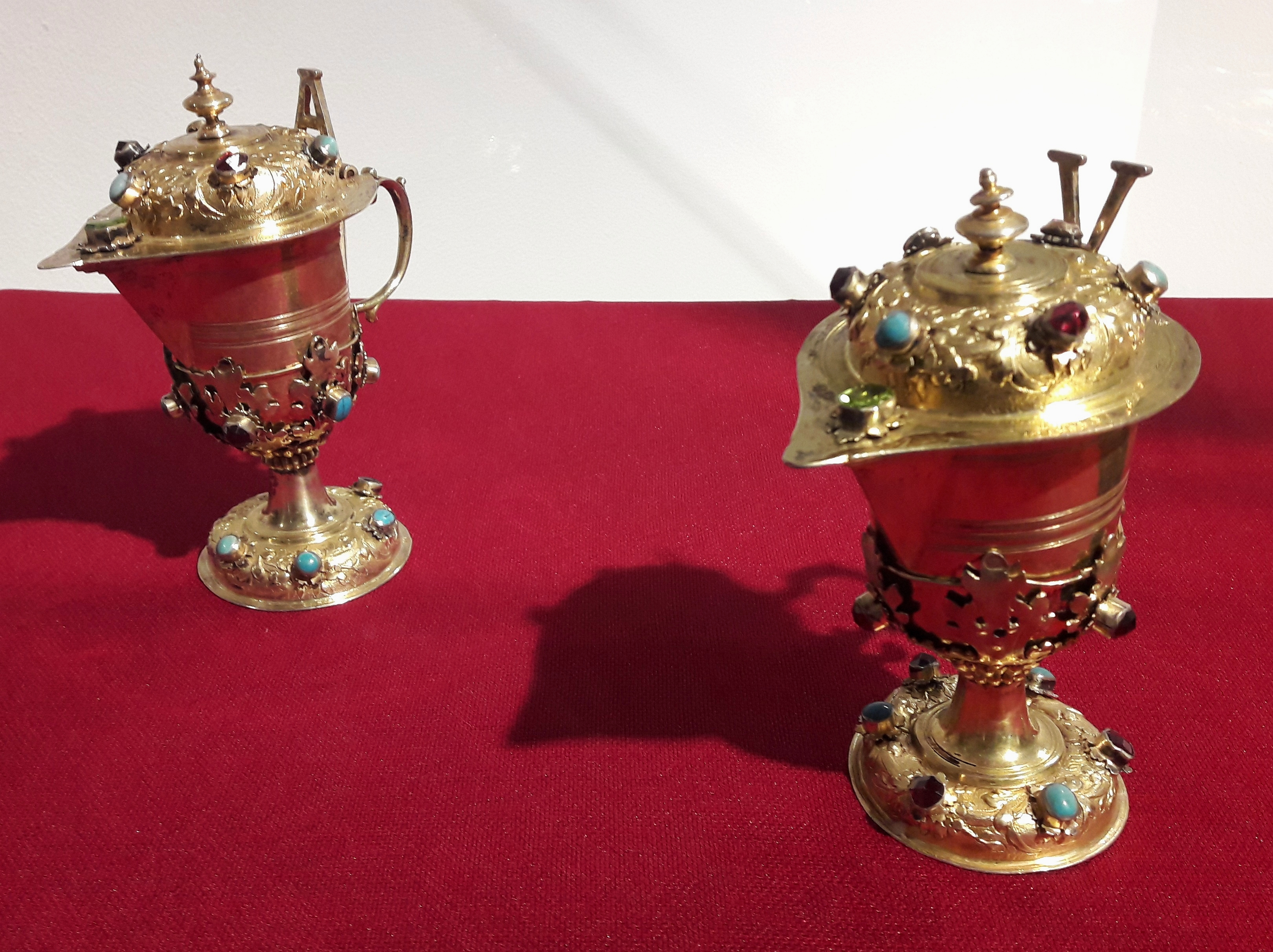
Burettes, or silver and gemstones altar cruet set, from France

Often they were richly decorated metal jugs, or made of glass or jasper, called a burette in French.

The reduced form of the present cruets dates, at least, from the 12th century.

In low church Anglican Churches, altar cruets are no longer used.

== See also ==
- Aquamanile
- Cruet
- Ciborium (container)
- Pyx
