= Pyx =

Small round lidded box

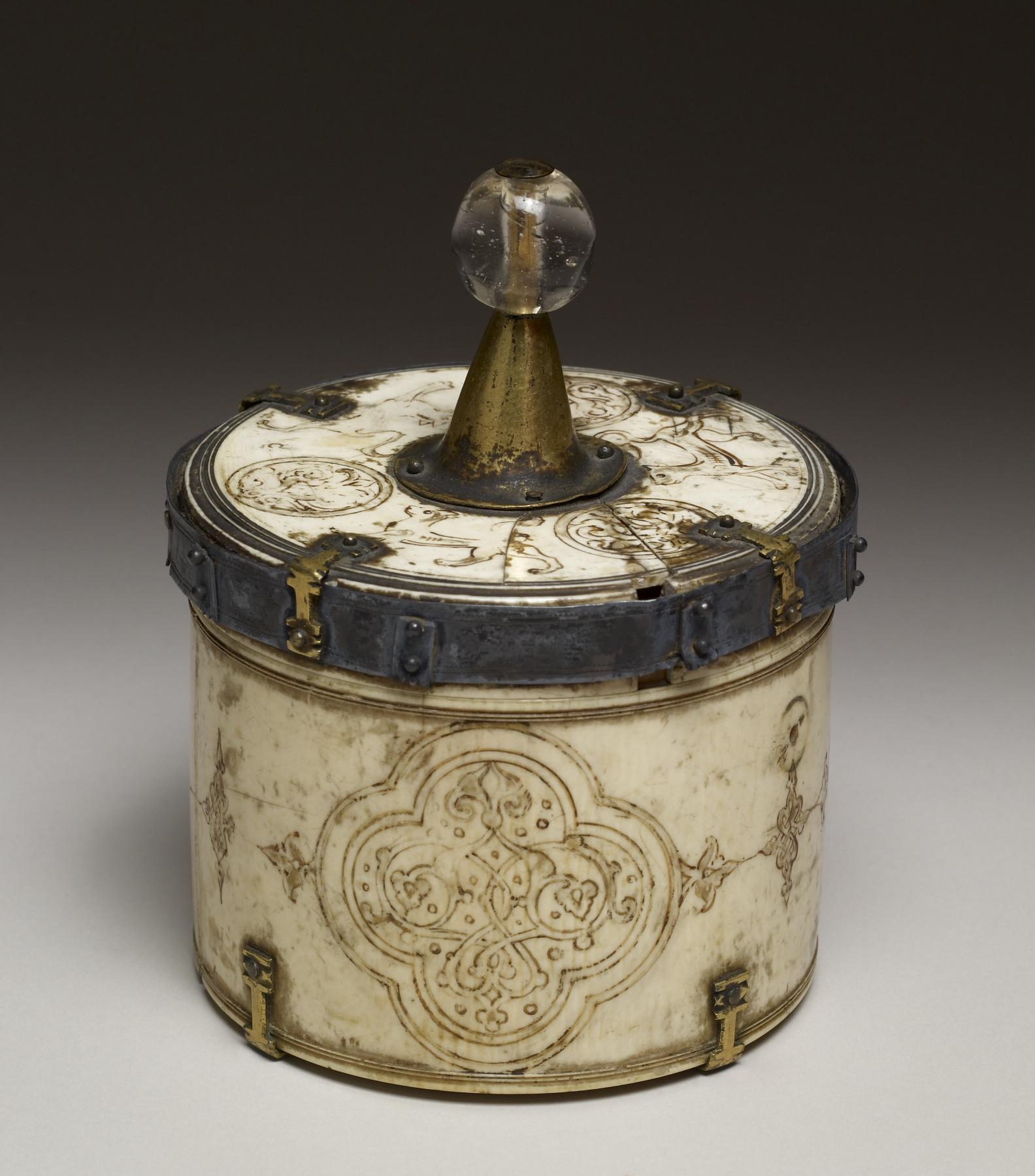
Pyx with Arabesques in Quatrofoil Frames, c. 13th century

A pyx or pix (Latin: pyxis, transliteration of Greek: πυξίς, boxwood receptacle, from πύξος, box tree) is a small round container used in the Catholic, Old Catholic, Lutheran and Anglican Churches to carry the Eucharist, to the sick or those who are otherwise unable to come to a church in order to receive Holy Communion. The term can also be used in archaeology and art history to describe small, round lidded boxes designed for any purpose from antiquity or the Middle Ages, such as those used to hold coins for the Trial of the Pyx in England.

== Usage ==
The word pyx comes from the Greek word πυξίς, pyxis 'box, receptacle'. (The Greek-like plural, pyxides, has given way to pyxes in English.) While the word may be applied to any covered carrier, in modern usage the term "pyx" usually denotes a small, flat, clamshell-style container, often about the size of a pocket watch and usually made of brass or other metals, traditionally lined with gold. A fabric or leather pouch for carrying a pyx is known as a burse. Typically, this kind of burse can be securely closed and is fixed with cords so that the priest, deacon, or extraordinary minister of Holy Communion can affix it to his or her person during transport to prevent the consecrated hosts from being accidentally lost.

These objects, and others, such as the lunette (and the monstrance that holds it) that contain a consecrated host, are normally kept within the church tabernacle when they are not being carried. The tabernacle may be behind the main altar, at a side altar, or within a special Eucharistic chapel.

== Liturgical history ==
In late antiquity, the custom developed in the East of suspending a vessel in the form of a dove (Greek: peristerion, Latin: peristerium) over the altar, which was used as a repository for the Blessed Sacrament. This custom is mentioned by Gregory of Tours in his Life of Saint Basil, and in several ancient French documents. The custom probably came to France from the East; it never seems to have existed in Italy. Examples of this practice may still be found in use today; for instance, in the Cathedral of the Dormition in Moscow.

== In Eastern Christianity ==
In the Eastern Orthodox, Eastern Lutheran and Greek Catholic Churches, the pyx (Russian: даро́носица, romanized: darónositsa) is the small "church tabernacle" which holds the lamb (host) that is reserved for the Liturgy of the Presanctified Gifts during Great Lent. This pyx may be either kept on the Holy Table or on the Prothesis (Table of Oblation) on the north side of the sanctuary.

== Gallery ==
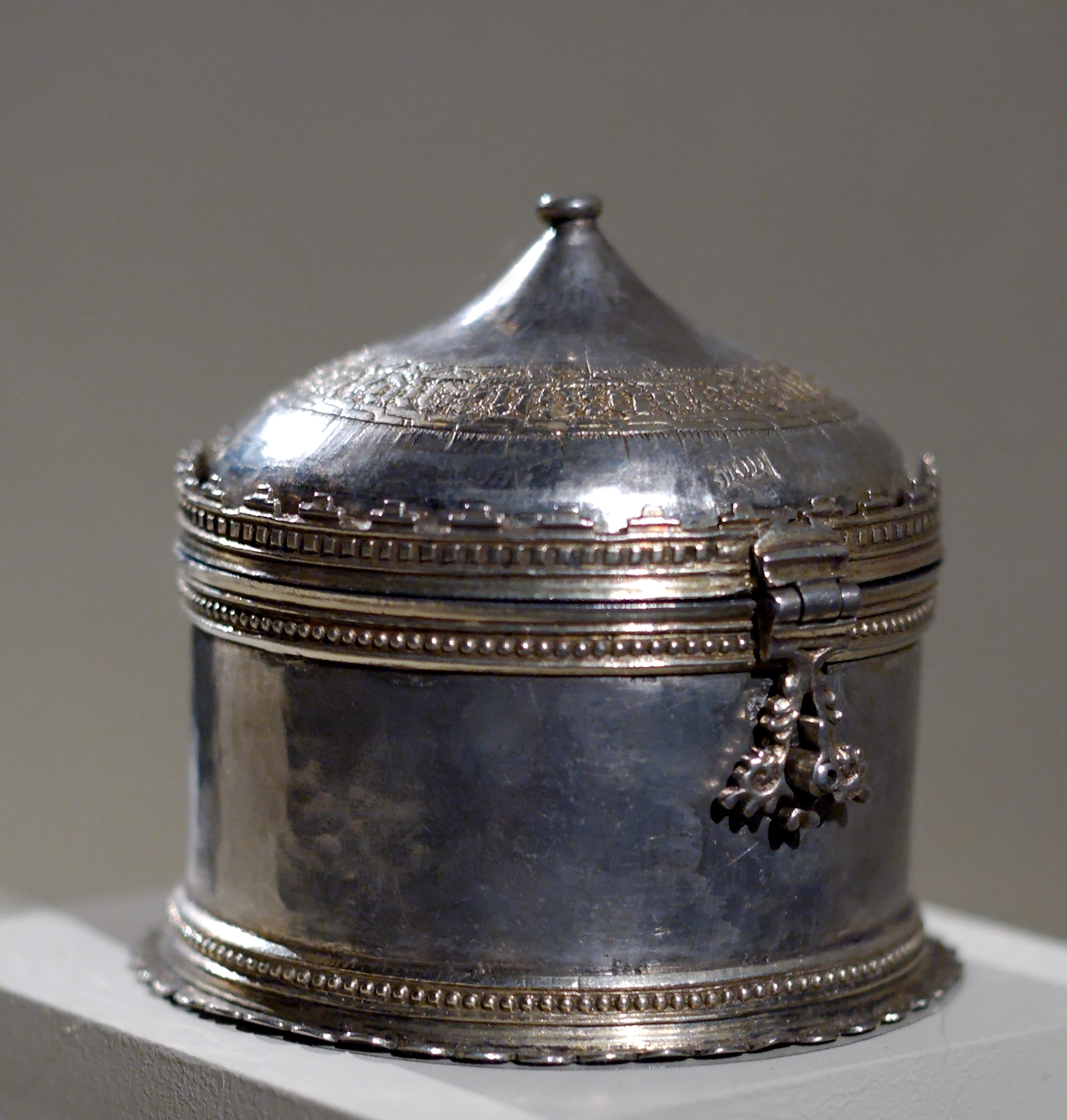
Silver gilt pyx, south of France or Spain, 15th century (Musée de Cluny)

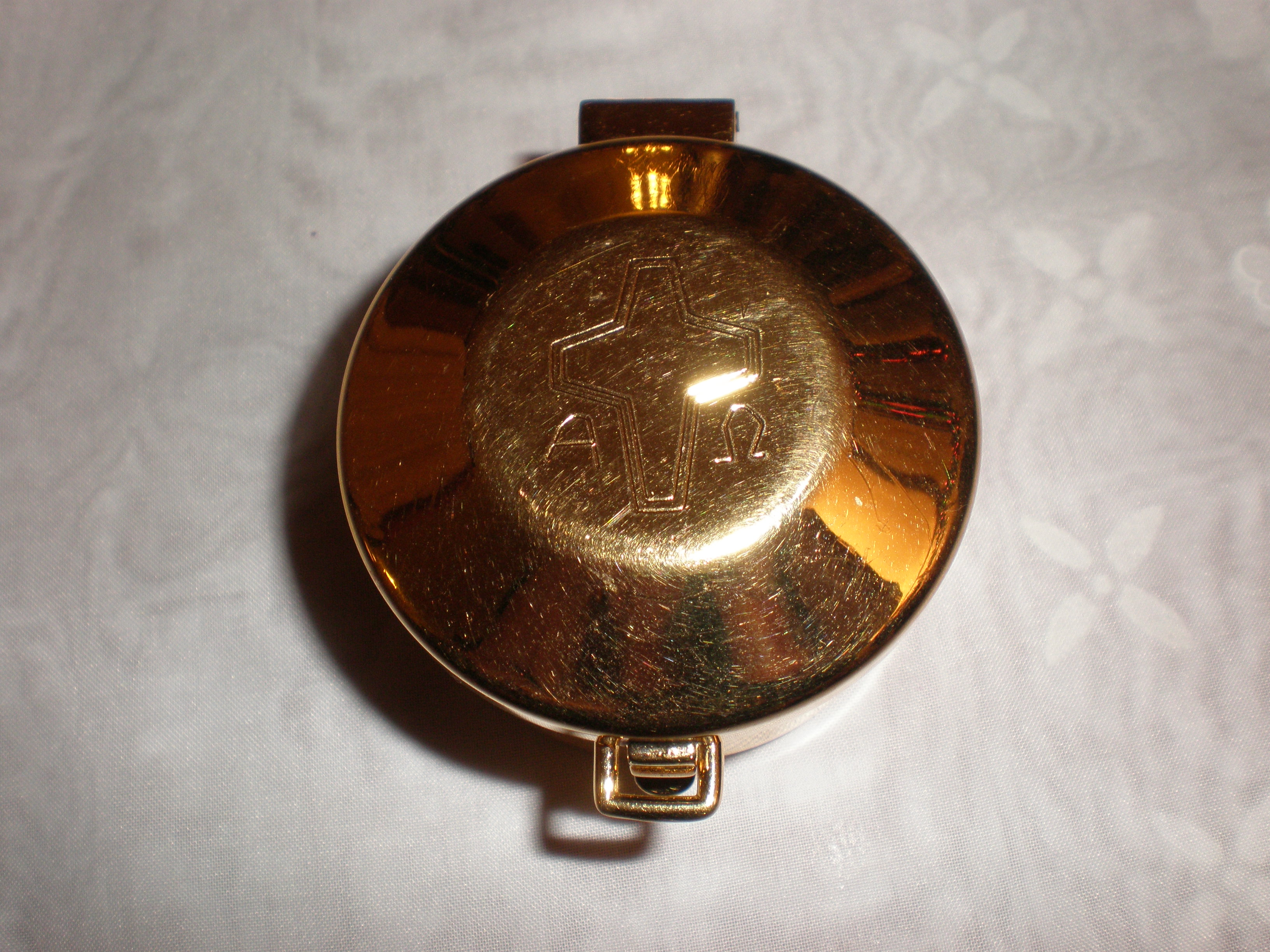
Bronze pyx for carrying the Eucharist

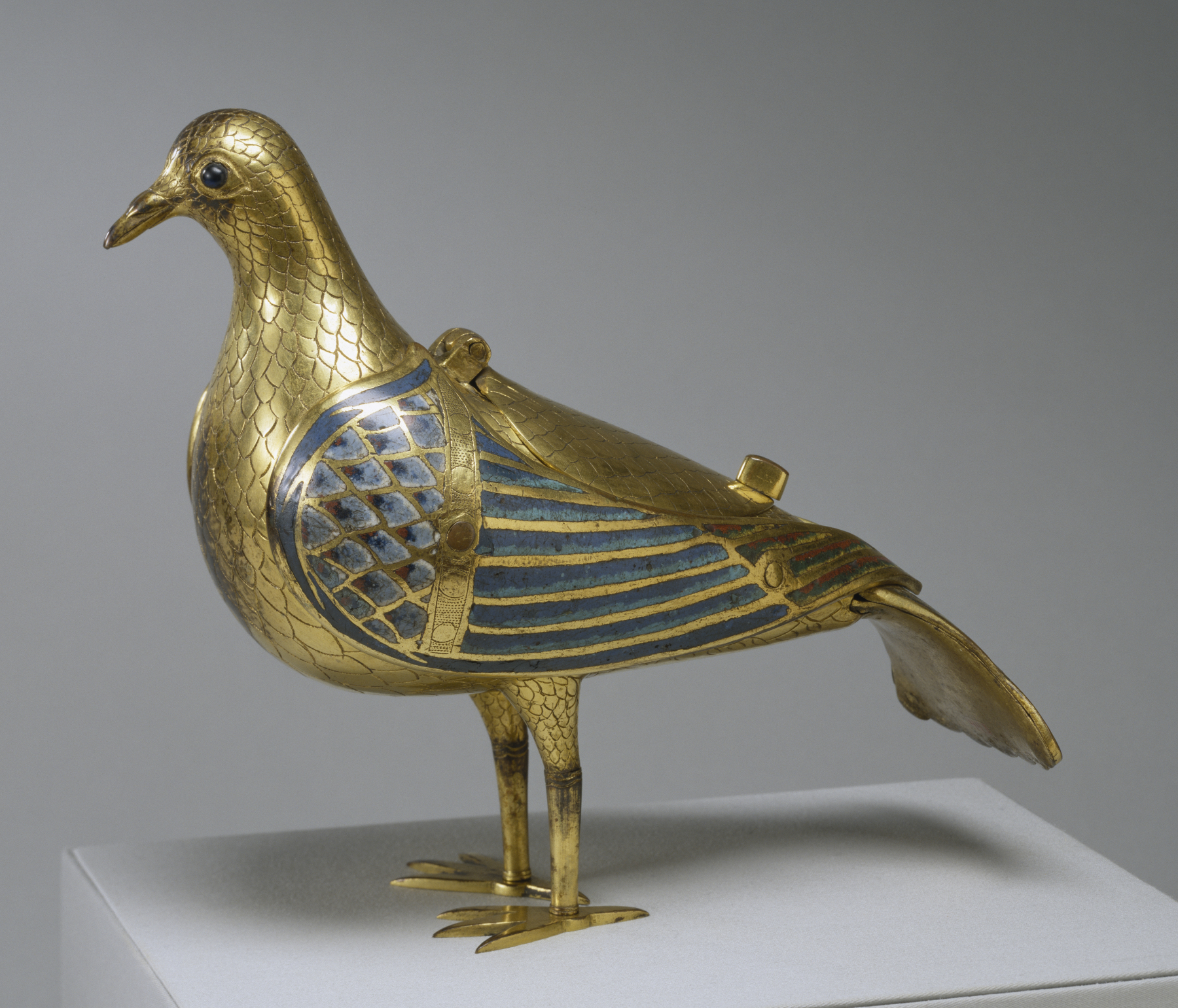
Eucharistic dove (Walters Art Museum)

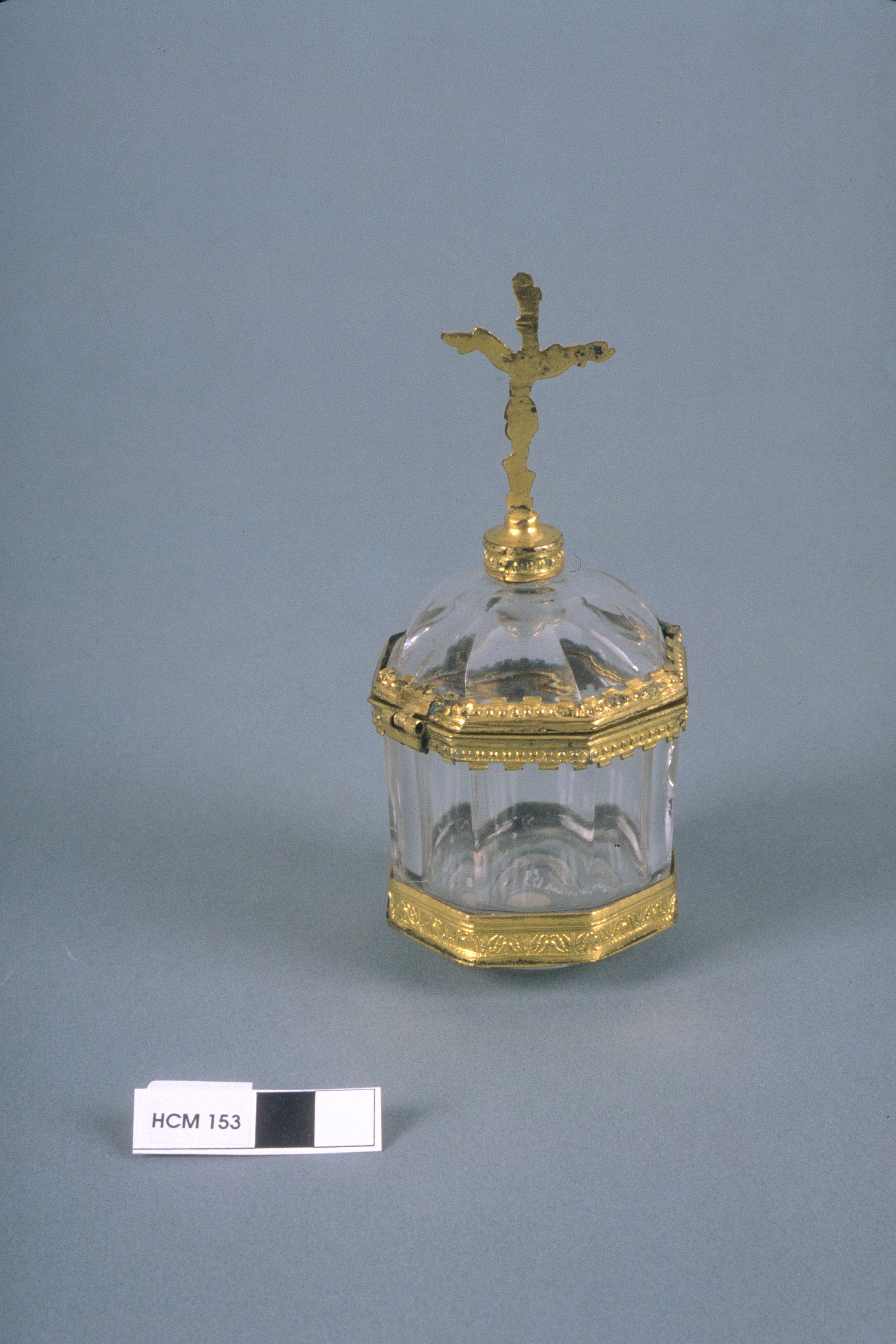
Rock crystal with copper-gilt mounts pyx from 20th century (Hunt Museum)

== See also ==
- Ciborium (container)
- Paten
