= Ciborium (container) =

Cup

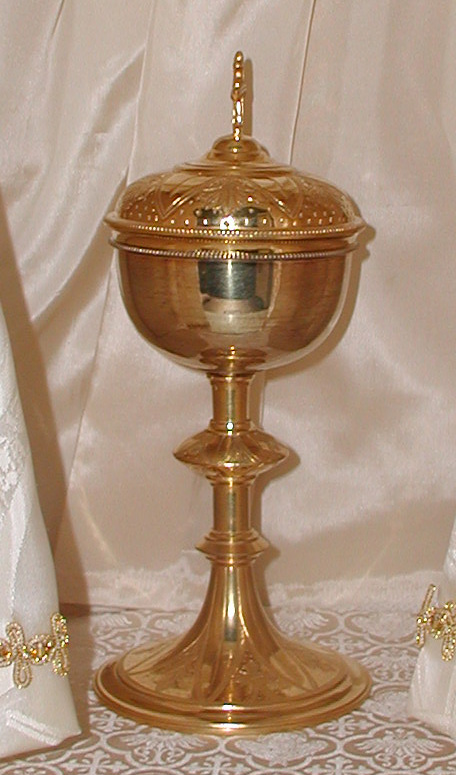
Silver-gilt ciborium

A ciborium (plural ciboria; Medieval Latin ciborium "drinking cup", from the Ancient Greek κιβώριον kibōrion, "drinking cup") is a vessel, normally in metal. It was originally a particular shape of drinking cup in ancient Greece and Rome, but the word later came to refer to a large covered cup designed to hold hosts for, and after, the Eucharist, thus the counterpart (for the bread) of the chalice (for the wine).

The word is also used for a large canopy over the altar of a church, which was a common feature of Early Medieval church architecture, now relatively rare.

== History ==
The ancient Greek word referred to the cup-shaped seed vessel of the Egyptian water-lily Nelumbium speciosum and came to describe a drinking cup made from that seed casing, or in a similar shape. These vessels were particularly common in ancient Egypt and the Greek East. The word "ciborium" was also used in classical Latin to describe such cups, although the only example to have survived is in one of Horace's odes (2.7.21–22).

In medieval Latin, and in English, "Ciborium" more commonly refers to a covered container used in Roman Catholic, Anglican, Lutheran and related churches to store the consecrated hosts of the sacrament of Holy Communion. It resembles the shape of a chalice but its bowl is more round than conical, and takes its name from its cover, surmounted by a cross or other sacred design. In the early Catholic Church, Holy Communion was not kept in churches for fear of sacrilege or desecration; the religion was still largely illegal and subject to frequent persecutions. Later, the first ciboria were kept at homes to be handy for the Last Rites where needed. In churches, a ciborium is usually kept in a tabernacle or aumbry. The ciborium may be veiled to indicate the presence of the consecrated hosts, as shown in this article's photo gallery. It is typically made, or at least plated, in a precious metal.

Other containers for the host include the paten (a small plate) or a basin (for loaves of bread rather than wafers) used at the time of consecration and distribution at the main service of Holy Eucharist. A pyx is a small, circular container into which a few consecrated hosts can be placed. Pyxes are typically used to bring communion to the sick or housebound.

== Gallery ==
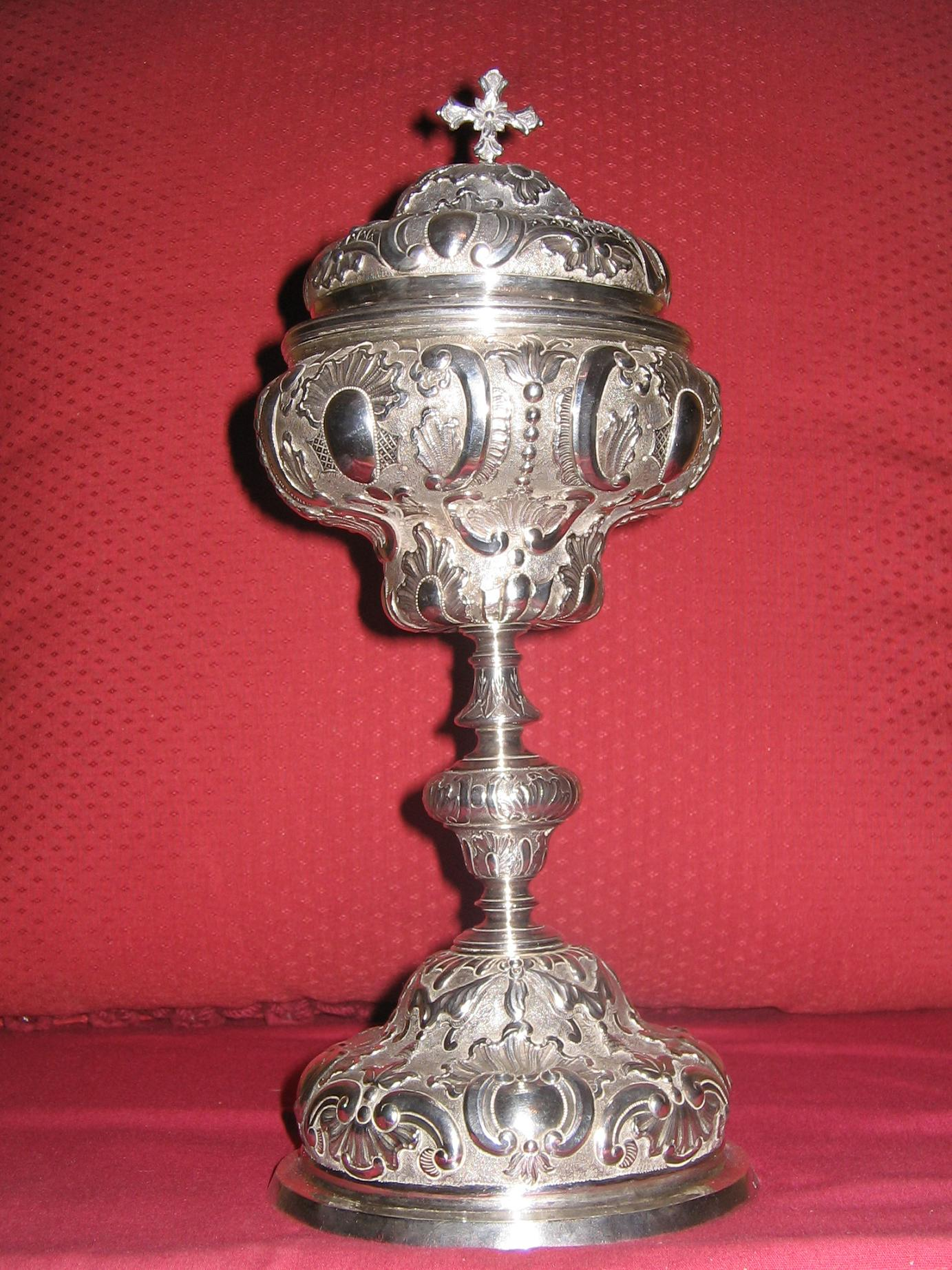
Silver Baroque ciborium, Church of Saint Peter, Ayerbe, Aragon, 18th century

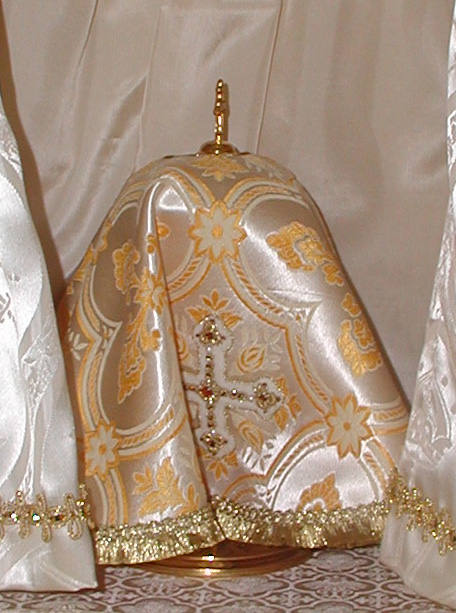
Ciborium covered by a veil

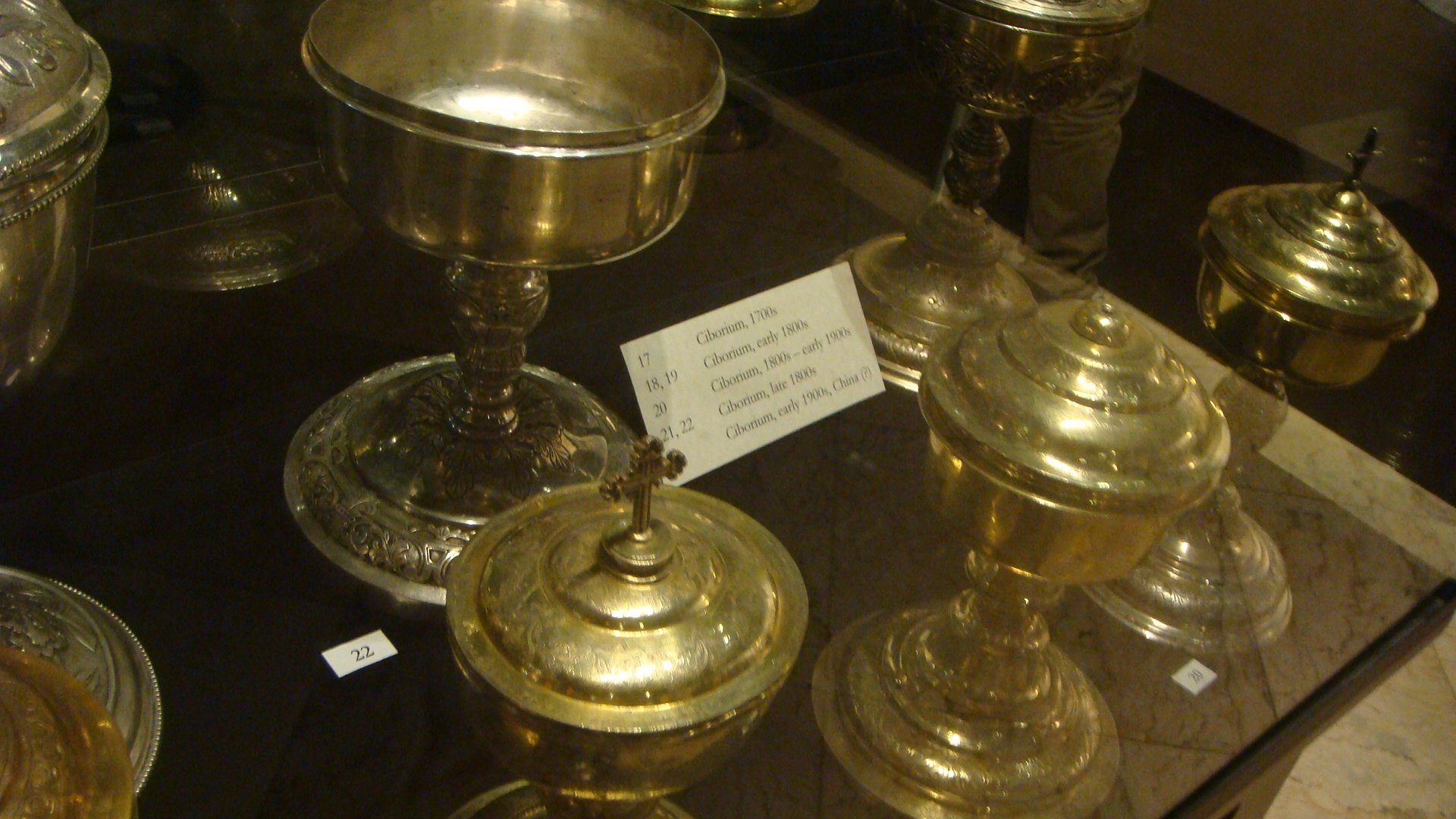
A collection of ciboria from the 18th-20th centuries, Our Lady of Manaoag Museum, Philippines

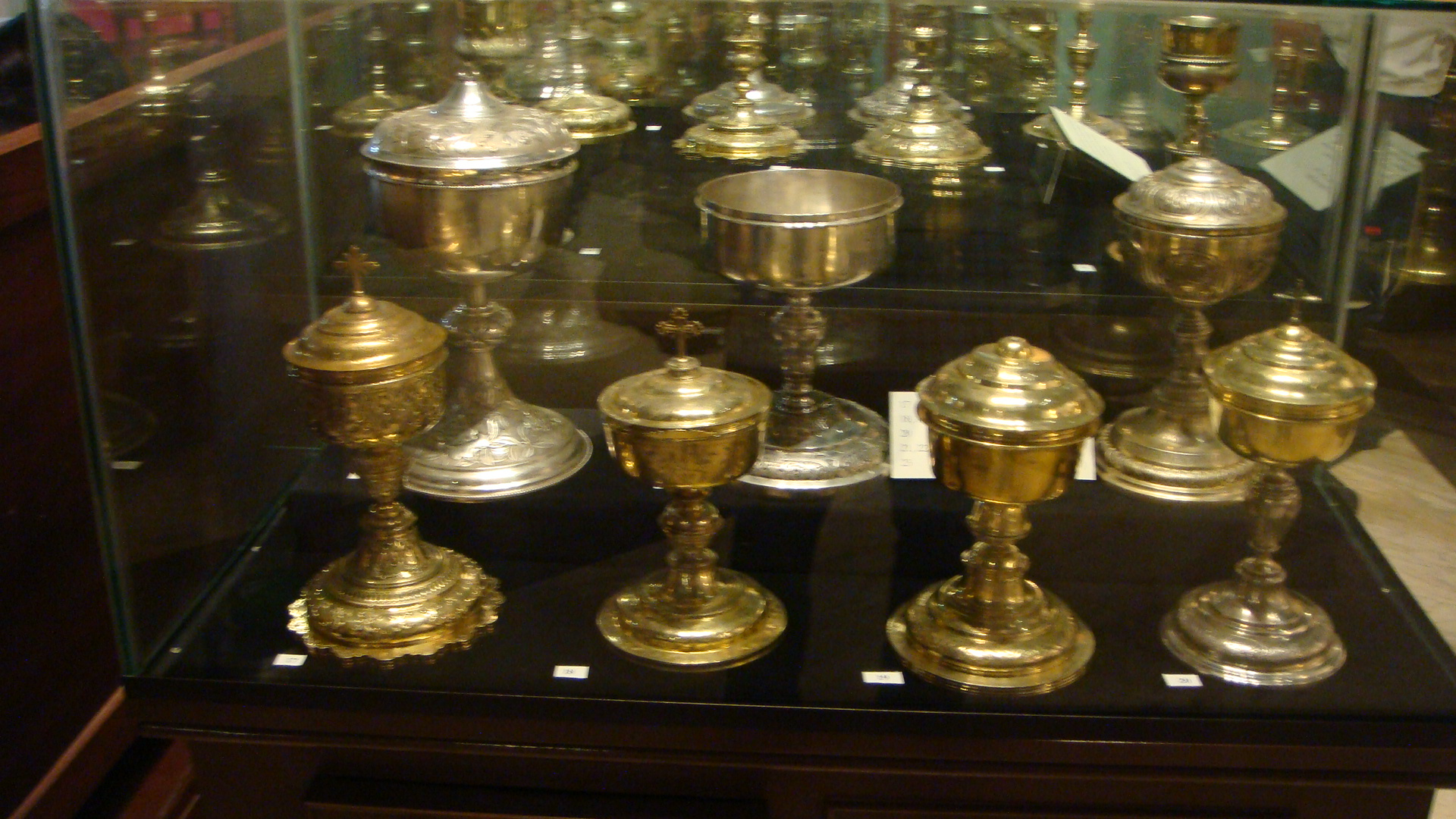
Ciboria, Our Lady of Manaoag Museum, Philippines

== See also ==
- Altar cruet
- Aspergillum
- Paten
- Pyx
