= Altar cloth =

Textile covering for an altar

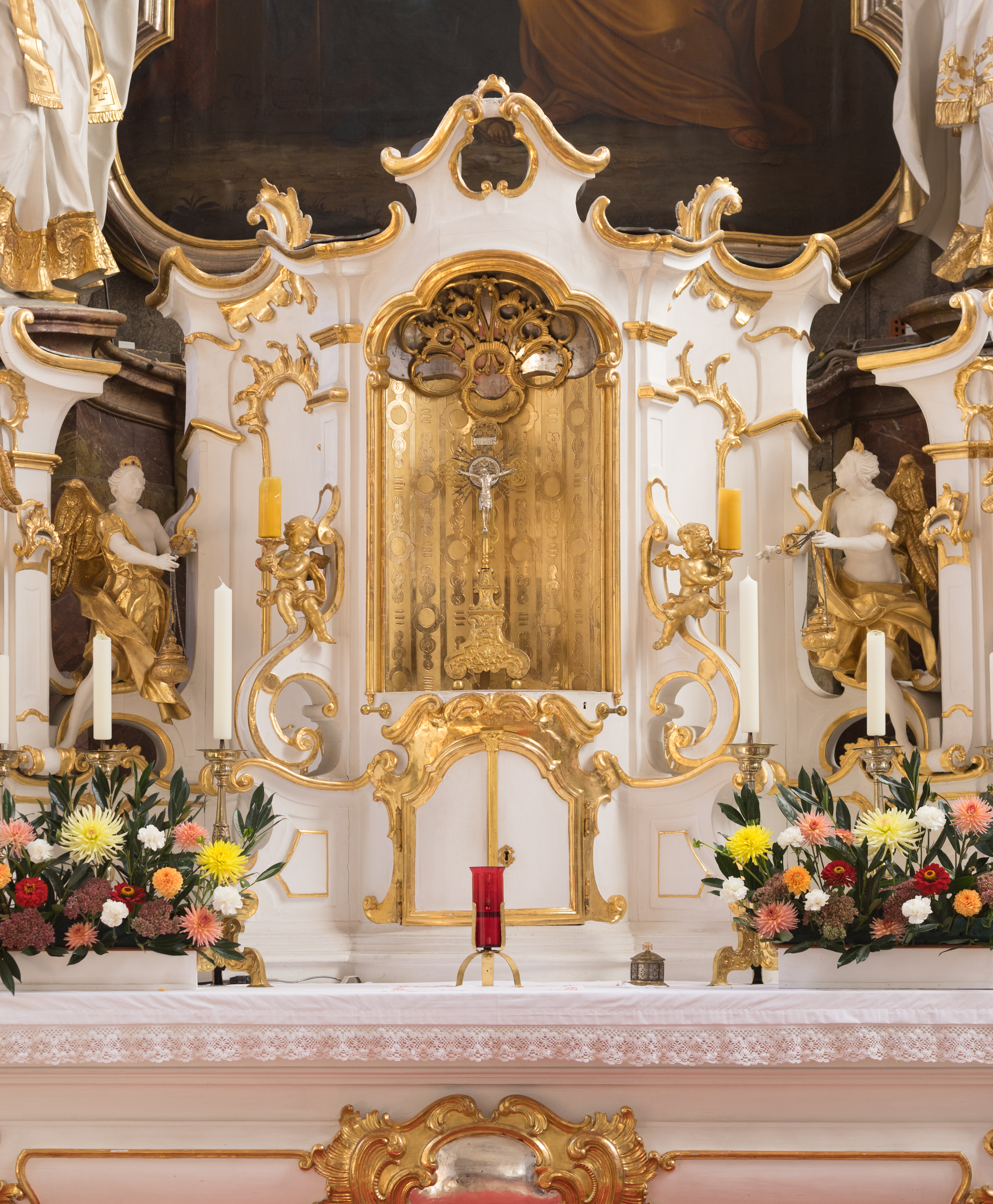
Altar cloth in the Roman rite

An altar cloth is used in the Christian liturgy to cover the altar. It serves as a sign of reverence as well as a decoration and a protection of the altar and the sacred vessels. In Orthodox churches it is covered by the antimension, which also contains the relics of saints.

Since the 2nd century the altar cloth has been seen as a symbol for the shroud of Jesus Christ; therefore it should be made of white linen. Another interpretation used two cloths and compared them with the body and soul of Christ.

== Christian altar cloths ==
=== Western Churches ===
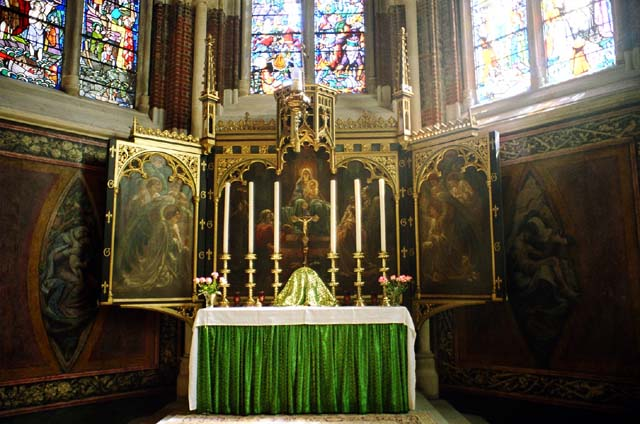
The High Altar at St. John the Divine, Kennington, London.

Special cloths (not necessarily made of linen) cover the altar in many Christian churches during services and celebrations, and are often left on the altar when it is not in use. In the early 20th century the Catholic Church considered only linen or hemp to be acceptable as material for altar cloths, although in earlier centuries silk or cloth of gold or silver were used. The Anglican Communion had similar rules in that period.

At that time, the Roman Rite required the use of three altar cloths, to which a cere cloth, not classified as an altar cloth, was generally added. This was a piece of heavy linen treated with wax (cera, from which "cere" is derived, is the Latin word for "wax") to protect the altar linens from the dampness of a stone altar, and also to prevent the altar from being stained by any wine that may be spilled. It was exactly the same size as the mensa (the flat rectangular upper surface of the altar).

Above this were placed two linen cloths. Like the cere cloth, they were made of heavy linen exactly the same size as the mensa of the altar. They acted as a cushion and, with the cere cloth, prevented the altar from being dented by heavy vases or communion vessels placed on top. Instead of two cloths, a single long cloth folded so that each half covered the whole mensa was acceptable.

The topmost cloth was the fair linen, a long white linen cloth laid over the two linen cloths. It had the same depth as the mensa of the altar, but was longer, generally hanging over the edges to within a few inches of the floor or, according to some authorities, it should hang 18 inches (46 cm) over the ends of the mensa. On an altar without antependium and consisting of the mensa resting on columns or made after the fashion of a tomb the topmost linen did not have to overhang the edges at the sides. It could be trimmed with lace on the ends and could be ornamented with figures of chalices, hosts and the like. Five small crosses might be embroidered on the fair linen – one to fall at each corner of the mensa, and one in the middle of the front edge. These symbolised the five wounds of Jesus. The fair linen should be left on the altar at all times. When removed for replacement, it should be rolled, not folded. It symbolized the shroud in which Jesus was wrapped for burial.

- A vesperal cloth, or coverlet, of the same heavy linen as the cere cloth and the linen cloths, and of the same length and width as the fair linen, was left on the altar whenever it was not in use. It simply protected the altar from dust and debris.

The present rules of the Roman Rite are much less detailed, stating only:

Out of reverence for the celebration of the memorial of the Lord and for the banquet in which the Body and Blood of the Lord are offered, there should be, on an altar where this is celebrated, at least one cloth, white in colour, whose shape, size, and decoration are in keeping with the altar's structure.

==== Chalice cloths ====
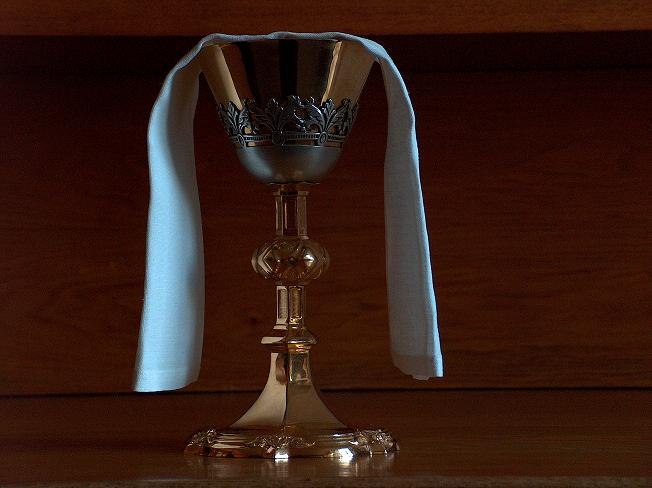
A purificator laid on a chalice

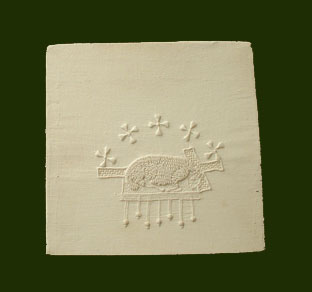
A pall, embroidered with the Agnus Dei

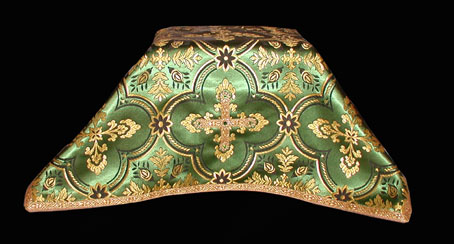
A chalice veil laid over the holy vessels

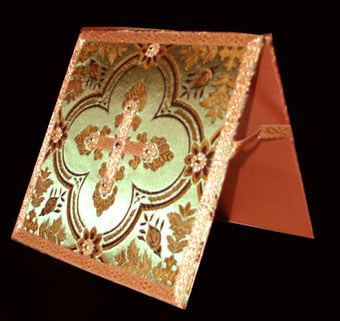
A burse

There are also special linens which pertain to the Eucharist:

- The purificator (purificatorium or more anciently emunctorium) is a white linen cloth which is used to wipe the chalice after each communicant partakes. It is also used to wipe the chalice and paten during the ablutions which follow Communion.
- The pall (palla) is a stiffened square card covered with white linen, usually embroidered with a cross, or some other appropriate symbol. The purpose of the pall is to keep dust and insects from falling into the Eucharistic elements.
- The corporal is a large square white cloth upon which the chalice and paten are placed when the Eucharist is celebrated. It may be edged with fine lace, and a cross may be embroidered on it near the front edge, where the Tridentine Mass prescribed that the host be placed. Embroidery in the centre was not used, lest the chalice become unstable.
- The manuterge (also called lavabo towel) is used by the priest to dry his hands after washing them (see lavabo).
- The chalice veil: "It is a praiseworthy practice for the chalice to be covered with a veil, which may be either of the colour of the day or white."
- In the Tridentine Mass, the rubrics for Low Mass laid down that the priest was to begin by carrying with him from the sacristy to the altar the chalice, upon which was placed the purificator, paten and pall, all of these covered with a chalice veil and surmounted by a burse (known in Old English as a "corporas-case") containing the corporal. The burse was a folder made of two square pieces of stiff card or wood laid one on top of the other and bound together along one edge to form a hinge. The two pieces were attached with cloth along the two sides adjacent to the hinge, leaving the fourth side open to receive the corporal. At the end of Mass, the priest carried all these back to the sacristy, arranged after the same fashion. The present General Instruction of the Roman Missal does not envisage the use of a burse.

==== Frontals ====
In the Roman Rite all of the linen cloths are white, including their decoration. and the Anglican churches generally follow the same usage. Other more decorative cloths sometimes used to decorate the front and back of the altar are:

- The frontal, or Antependium, is the same size as the front of the altar. It is often richly decorated, made of tapestry, silk or damask. Some frontals are matchless works of art, exhibiting the finest materials and embroidery possible. Other churches opt for a plain frontal. One characteristic is shared by all frontals: they are coloured green, red, purple, blue, black, white, gold or of unbleached muslin, and are changed according to the colour of the Church year. Purple for Advent and the first three weekdays of for Holy Week; white or gold for Christmas, Easter and some Holy Days; green for Ordinary Time (after Epiphany and Pentecost); violet or purple or unbleached muslin for Lent; red for Pentecost and feasts of martyrs ed saints. In some Anglican parishes there is a special crimson set for Holy Week. In this way the altar has various different frontals hung upon it on different days throughout the year. The frontal may be fixed to either the cere cloth or the linen cloth to hold it in place, which cloth must be fastened to the rear edge of the altar.
- The frontlet is similar to the frontal, that is the exact width of the altar, but only ten to twelve inches deep. It hangs over the frontal, and is generally of the same colour and material. It sometimes has a short text embroidered upon it in large letters, such as "Sanctus, Sanctus, Sanctus". Again, the frontlet is rotated according to the colour of the church year. Like the frontal the frontlet is fastened to either the cere cloth or the linen cloth. Or, alternatively, it may be fastened to a wooden frame or strip that can be hooked in place at the front of the altar.

==== Variants ====
According to the Catholic Encyclopedia, altar-cloths were commonly used prior to the 4th century. Pope Boniface III is reputed to have passed a decree in the 7th century making the use of altar cloths mandatory. The use of three cloths most likely began in the 9th century and was obligatory for Roman Rite churches at the time of the Catholic Encyclopedia.

Previously, all Christian Churches used altar cloths. However, today some use no cloths on the altar or only the fair linen. Several variants of the above cloths and linens are also in use. Some Churches use a frontlet and no frontal, especially where the altar is richly decorated and a frontal would hide it. Where only a frontlet is used, in many cases the frontlet is permanently attached to the linen cloth, and so the linen cloth must be replaced with the frontlet. Many Churches dispense with the cere cloth and the coverlet.

Many churches of the Anglican Communion follow the tradition of the Roman Rite in preparing the altar for the Eucharist. There are varying practices in the Episcopal Church; some do not use the elaborate altar dressing previously laid down for the Roman Rite and instead usually use only a white fair linen cloth to cover the top of the altar. According to a glossary found on an Episcopal parish's website, the altar cloth they use "... covers the top of the altar and hangs down the sides almost to the floor." Lutherans also use a single fair linen on their altar, though many use the coloured frontlet or frontal as well. An exception being the Church of Sweden, which generally continues to use the threefold dressing of the altar, albeit does not prescribe it as necessary.

Likewise, the text The Doctrines and Discipline of the Methodist Church specifies that "The Lord's Table should have upon it a fair linen cloth."

=== Eastern Churches ===
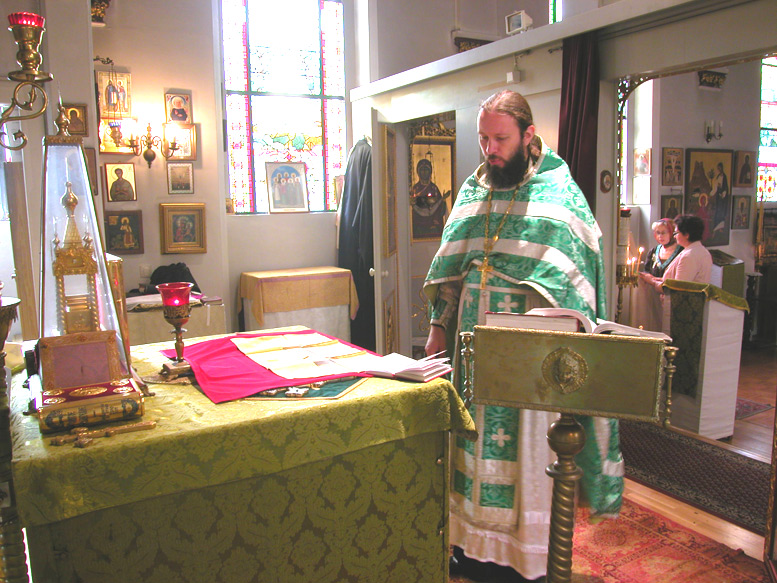
A Russian Orthodox priest celebrating Divine Liturgy. On the Holy Table (altar) is a green indítia, and the Antimens (gold) with its eileton (red) has been opened.

In the Eastern Orthodox and Eastern Catholic Churches of Byzantine Rite, the altar is referred to as the Holy Table or Throne (Church Slavonic: Prestol). Although there are variations, normally it will be completely covered on all four sides with three clothes.

- The katasarka from Greek, or strachítsa, from Slavonic (related to the word for a shirt), is the first cloth to cover the Holy Table. It is a plain linen cover which is bound to the altar with cords at the time of its consecration, and is never removed. This linen covering symbolizes the winding sheet in which the body of Christ was wrapped when he was laid in the tomb. Since the altar is never seen uncovered thereafter, these tend to be constructed more with sturdiness than aesthetics in mind.
- The Indítion is placed above this first cover and is an ornamented cover, often in a brocade of a color that may change with the liturgical season. This outer covering usually comes all the way to the floor and represents the glory of God's Throne. When the Indítion is laid out flat it forms a Greek cross, with the center covering the top of the Holy Table, and the "arms" of the cross covering the four sides.
- A third covering is made of the same material as the Indítion, but is smaller and square, covering the top of the Holy Table and coming down only a few inches on all four sides, something like the Western frontlet.

The Antimension (Church Slavonic: Antimens) is similar to the Western corporal, though it serves a function similar to an altar stone, as well as a Celebret. It is a piece of silk or linen which usually has an icon of the Deposition from the Cross depicted on it, and relics of a martyr sewn into it. It also contains the Signature of the reigning Bishop of the church, as well as the date of consecration of the antimension and the place for which it was consecrated. Unlike the Western corporal, the Antimension is not removed from the Holy Table after the Eucharist is over, but is kept in the center of the Holy Table, covered by the Gospel Book.

The Antimension is often wrapped in a slightly larger silk cloth, called the Eiliton to protect it, though pre-Nikonian Slavic practice is to place the antimension between the katasarka and the indition, where it is kept unfolded. The Eiliton is most-often red, and can be highly decorated with embroidery.

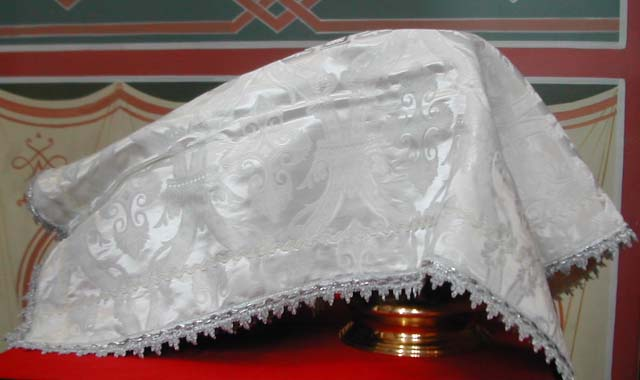
The diskos and chalice covered by the Aër at the conclusion of the Proskomedie.

The Eastern chalice veil is called the Aër and is quite a bit larger than the chalice veil used in the West. In addition to the Aër, there are two other smaller veils. These are often cross-shaped like the Indítia and one is used to cover the chalice, and one is used to cover the diskos (paten).

There are usually one or two communion cloths (houselling cloths) kept on the Holy Table. These are made of cotton or some similar material that can be easily washed and are often dyed red. They are used like the Western purificator to wipe the lips of the communicants and to dry the chalice and other sacred vessels after the ablutions.

A dust cover is frequently used, either to cover only the Gospel Book or the entire top of the Holy Table. This cover is not, strictly speaking, a liturgical object, but is purely utilitarian. Because it will rest upon the Holy Table, it is usually made of a fair material, but not normally as rich as the indition.

Towels are used to dry the hands after lavabo, though their design and use are not as fixed as formerly in the West. When a bishop washes his hands, a larger and more ornate towel is used to dry his hands.

== Judaism ==
According to the Bible the Jews were using altar cloths at the time of the Exodus, "...And the table and his furniture, and the pure candlestick with all his furniture, and the altar of incense ... and the altar of burnt offering with all his furniture, and the laver and his foot, and the cloths of service..." (Exodus 31:8–10)

The Jews traditionally used colour, "And of the blue, and purple, and scarlet, they made cloths of service..." which were to be used by the priests inside the tabernacle. Since all of the other items made from fabric for use in the tabernacle were made from fine linen it is reasonable to assume that the cloths of service were also made from linen.(Exodus 39:1) Unfortunately, Exodus does not give the dimensions of the cloths, nor does it indicate how or when the cloths were to be used.

The practice of using altar cloths disappeared when the Temple in Jerusalem was destroyed in AD 70. The focus of worship turned towards the synagogue and the need for an altar disappeared. There is a table where the Torah scrolls are laid for reading, called a bimah, and another lower table called an amud, that is, a lectern. The lectern is covered with an embroidered cloth covering the area on which the Torah scroll will rest during the parashah (lection—see Torah reading). The Torah ark in the synagogue is covered with a cloth called the parokhet to recall the veil which covered the entrance to the Holy of Holies.
