= Linens =

Fabric household goods intended for daily use

Linens, also referred to uncountably as linen, are fabric household goods intended for daily use, such as bedding, tablecloths, and towels. "Linens" may also refer to church linens, the altar cloths used in church.

== History ==
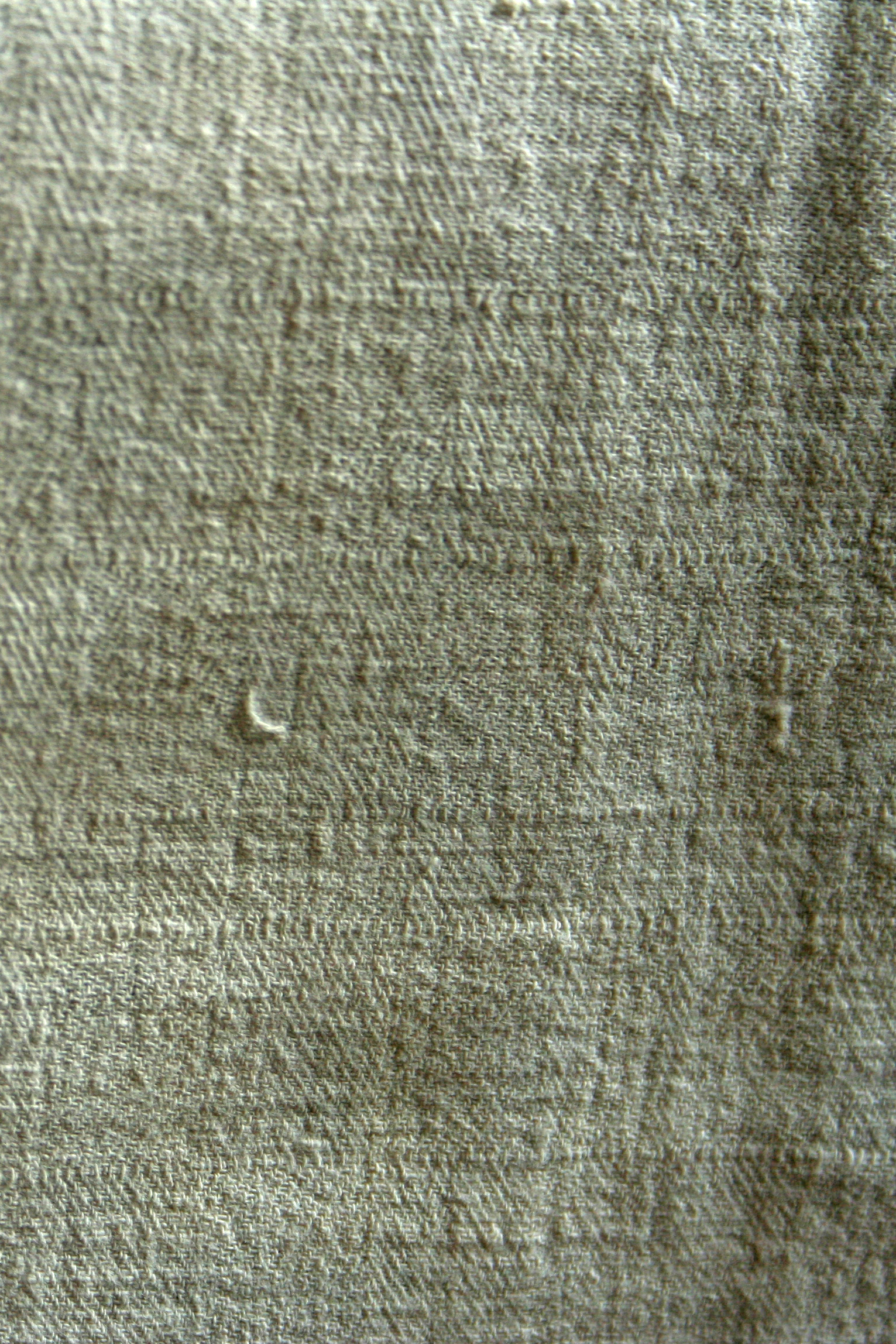
A close-up of the texture of hand-woven linen fabric made in the early 20th century in the Balkans.

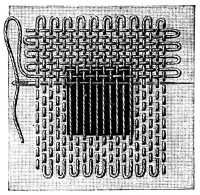
An illustration of how to darn linen, from the Encyclopedia of Needlework (1884) by Thérèse de Dillmont.

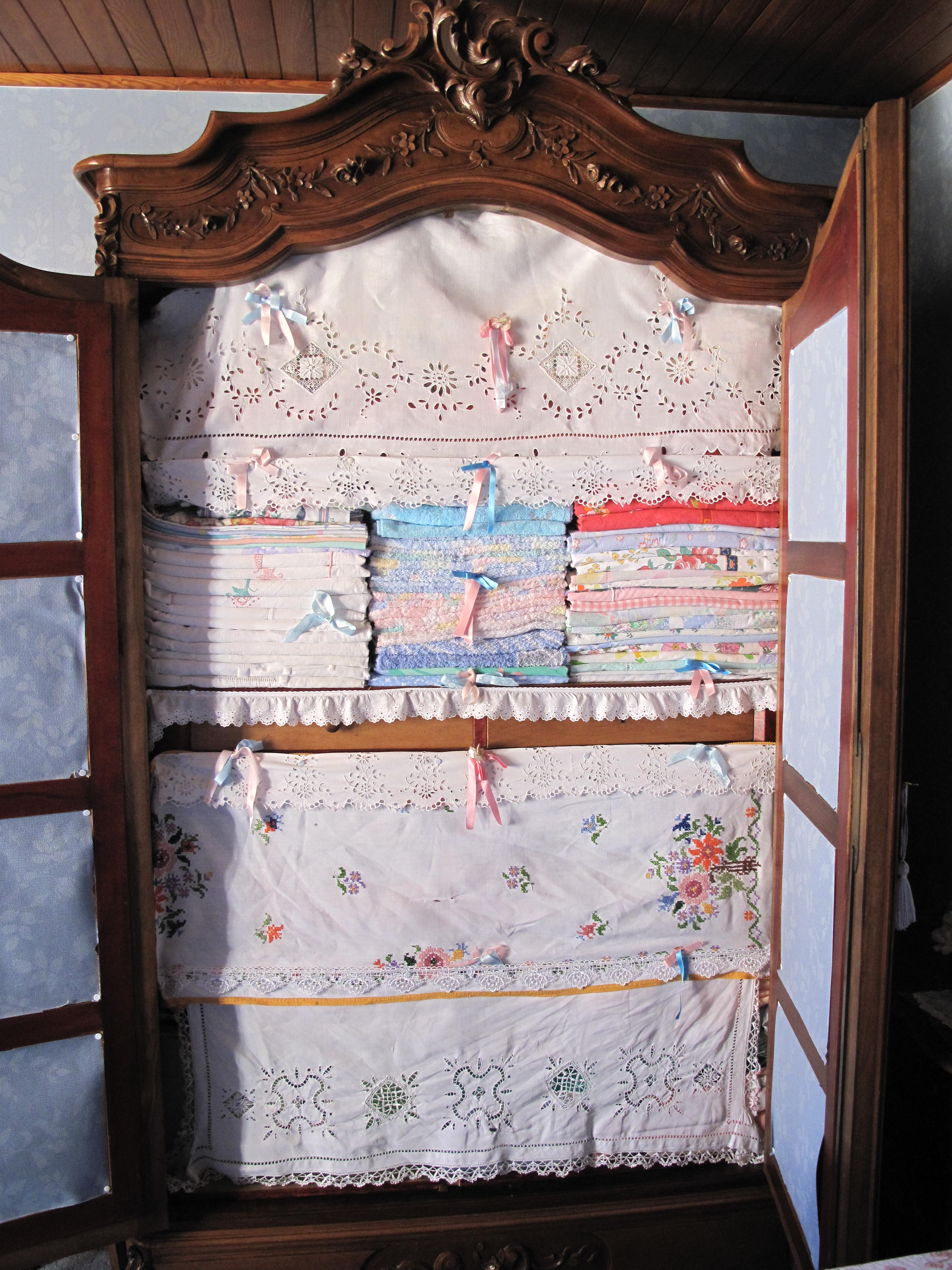
A French armoire with home linens arranged in a traditional manner, with embroidered dust covers over the shelves.

The earliest known household linens were made from thin yarn spun from flax fibres to make linen cloth. Ancient Egypt, Babylon, and Phoenicia all cultivated flax crops. The earliest surviving fragments of linen cloth have been found in Egyptian tombs and date to 4000 BCE. Flax fibres have been found in cloth fragments in Europe that date to the Neolithic prehistoric age.

Cotton is another popular fibre for making the cloth used for household linens. Its use in cloth-making also dates back to prehistoric times, in Indian subcontinent, China, Peru and Egypt. The Indian subcontinent was well known for high quality cotton cloth as early as 1500 BCE.

Linen was a popular cloth during the Middle Ages in Europe, cotton being an exotic import. It was used for undergarments such as chemises, shirts and blouses, and most clothing worn next to the skin by those able to afford an extra layer of clothing. The tradition of calling household fabric goods "linens" dates from this period, but meant clothing as much as large sheets. In medieval tradition, a bride would often be given a gift of linens made by the women in her family as a wedding present to help her set up her new married home. In France this was called a trousseau, and was often presented to the bride in a wooden hope chest.

The Industrial Revolution drastically changed cloth manufacturing. The rise of European colonialism during the time supported the rapid growth of cloth production by creating many cheap sources of raw materials. British cloth manufacturers would import raw cotton from America and British West Indies. Yarn spun in Ireland would be imported to England, where mechanized factories employed thousands of industrial weavers. In 1781, a cloth producer from Manchester testified about his business to a committee of the House of Commons in the British Parliament. He stated that he employed 6000 workers, who would print and stamp 60,000 yards of cotton and linen fabric a year. Cotton gradually replaced linen for most uses in clothing, but linen remained preferable for bedsheets and tablecloths. Other European countries manufactured and traded their own types of household linens as well, and mass manufacturing techniques and trade competition gradually made affordable household linens common.

Today, the term "linen" is still used for bedsheets, tablecloths and similar household textiles even though most are made of cotton, synthetic fabrics, or blends. In American English, they may be called "white goods", otherwise a term for kitchen major appliances.

== Cleaning and storage of linens ==
The cleaning of household linens is done as appropriate to the type of cloth. Household linens are most likely to have stains from organic sources such as food, blood, and soil. If the linens are made of natural fibres such as linen or cotton, the cloth will need to be rinsed in cold water as soon as possible to prevent the stain from becoming permanent. Stains from red wine, or red or purple berries and fruit are an exception and must be washed in boiling water. Despite this, these stains may be impossible to remove. Otherwise, regular washing of household linens should be done in hot water for hygienic reasons, to destroy bacteria from frequent use. Linen and cotton that are white may also become yellow over time. This is eliminated with liquid bleach, or by the traditional method of hanging the linens in the sun to let the sunlight bleach out the discoloration.

Household linens are stored near the area where they are used, when possible, for convenience. Otherwise, bed and kitchen and dining linens may be stored together in a linen closet or cupboard. There are many methods of folding linens for storage. For formal occasions, table linens may be ironed before use. Traditionally, table linens were starched while ironing to decrease wrinkling and retain a smooth, pristine appearance. Seasonal storage of linens led to the development of natural pest control methods in Europe to prevent moth larvae and other insects or rodents from eating the cloth. Sachets made of dried Margosa (neem), cloves, lavender, and other herbs are traditional, as are cedar wood chips.

=== Industrial cleaning of linens ===
Industrial laundries were developed in the Middle Ages, when large convents and monasteries used their own facilities. Hospitals and boarding schools followed this example. Today, there are several types of industrial laundries. Hospitals often use laundry chutes to collect used linens. These are transported to an industrial laundry, where they are sorted into three categories: regularly soiled, infected, or staff uniforms. They are laundered as appropriate, usually at high temperatures, to ensure that viruses, bacteria, and soil are cleaned and that the linens are hygienic before being returned to the hospital.

In India, Dhobi ghats provide laundry service to both institutions and households. Household linens and clothing are both collected on a fixed day of the week by the Dhobi, who washes the laundry at a ghat, which is often in a large Dhobi ghat zone where many Dhobis work at their own stall. Each stall is approximately four square metres. Laundry is washed in large tubs, rinsed, cleaned by beating on a stone made for the purpose, then the linens are hung on lines to dry. Industrial linens are treated in steamers for several hours for hygienic reasons. Dhobis also iron linens.

== Antique linens ==
The collecting and restoring of antique linens can be complex, depending upon the condition of the cloth. Many old household linens were stored filled with starch, which damages the cloth over time since it hardens and causes wearing and tears in the fabric where it is folded and creased. The owner of an antique linen must determine if conserving, repairing, or mending are appropriate.

Types of antique linens may be identified by the place where they were made. Some well known locations for making heirloom-quality household linens include Ireland, for its Irish linen and lace and Madeira, known for Madeira cloth. The type of embellishment on the linens may make them collectable, especially embroidery, including Victorian-era redwork and bluework, which use only red or blue thread. Lace embellishments on linens also make them collectable, such as Battenberg lace.

== White sale ==
January "White sales" have been a custom in the United States since the late 19th century. White sales are held by department stores to sell household linens, bedding and towels, at a price discount. The sales are called "White sales" since the sales started during an era when these items were only available in white.

== List of house linens ==
- apron
- bed sheet
- bed sheet fitted
- bed sheet flat
- bed skirt
- bedspread
- blanket
- curtain
- comforters
- dishcloth
- dishtowel
- doily
- duvet cover
- gloves
- handkerchief
- mattress pad/cover
- napkin
- oven glove
- placemat
- pillowcase
- pillow cover
- quilts
- ribbon
- sleepwear
- tablecloth
- table runner
- tea towel
- towel
- dresser scarf

== List of church linens ==
Church linens are used in some Christian churches, with the Roman Catholic Church having perhaps the most elaborate use of them. Linens are used to represent the sacred nature of the altar and to protect the Eucharist. Church linens include:

- Altar cloth (sometimes called the "Fair Linen")
- Antependium
- Antimension
- Baptismal cloth
- Burse
- Cere cloth
- Chalice veil
- Corporal
- Credence cloth
- Indítia
- Lavabo
- Pall
- Purificator
- Strachítsa
