= Sthathicon =

West Syriac Christian church document

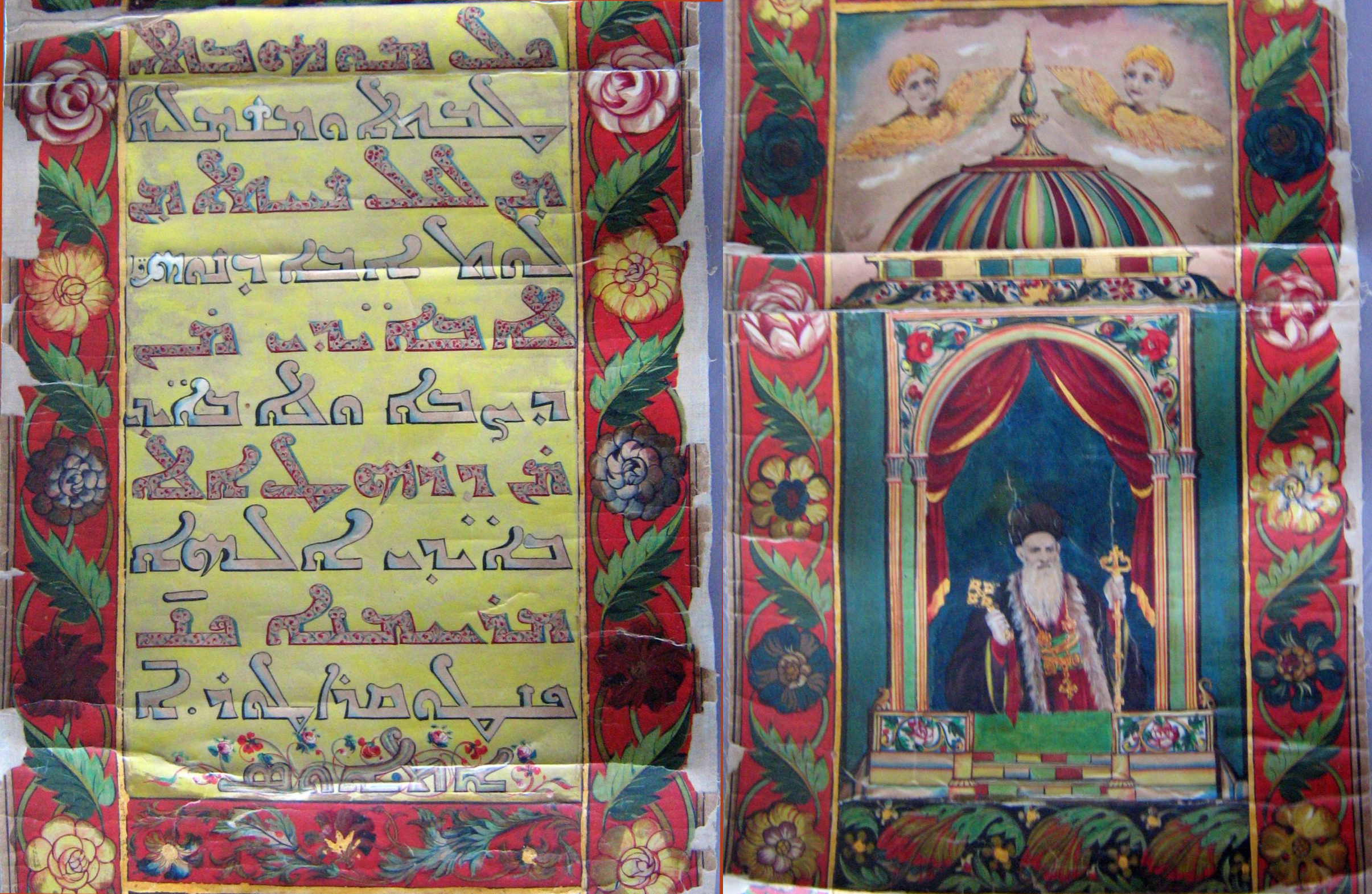
The sthathicon of Kadavil Paulose Mar Athanasius, 1877

A sthathicon (also transliterated sthathikon) or susthathikon is an ecclesial document of official authorization and agreement, typically certifying the consecration of bishops in Syriac Christianity.

== Description ==
A sthathicon serves as an official document in some West Syriac Rite Christian denominations, verifying whether an individual is authorized clergyman within that church. According to tradition, the document was used in the time of Mar Mari in Early Christianity to identify Saint Thomas Christian clergy in India who had officially been recognized by Antioch's clergy. These documents were used by Malankara Church officials in the 19th century to identify Oriental Protestants who had been educated by Anglican missionaries and declare their Holy Orders invalid.

The sthathicon features in West Syriac ordination ritual. Following the Omologio, a proclamation of faith, an episcopal candidate is to read aloud a sthathicon. This sthathicon can be written by his own hand professing the true faith, promising to abide by the apostolic constitutions, obedience and allegiance to the Patriarchal Throne." After reading it, the candidate signs it and hands it to the catholicos.

The Malankara Orthodox Syrian Church (MOSC) requires that a sthathicon be presented to bishops and metropolitans ("high priests" or "prelates") by the church's Catholicos. Gheevarghese (later Dionysius of Vattasseril), who agitated for the independence of the Malankara Church from the Syriac Orthodox Church, was ordained by the then Syriac Orthodox Patriarch of Antioch Ignatius Abded Aloho II in 1908. However, Gheevarghese was denied the sthathikon that typically accompanied the office due to his denial of the patriarch's temporal authority over the Malankara Church. When the MOSC was establishing a Western Rite mission in England following the influence of Antonio Francisco Xavier Alvares, it submitted a sthathicon to S.D. Baba to certify him as a priest. In the High Court of Kerala, the MOSC has argued that those without a sthathicon could not claim to be members of their clergy.

After clergy of the Jacobite Syrian Christian Church, a part of the Syriac Orthodox Church, are consecrated by the Syriac Orthodox Patriarch of Antioch as metropolitans, they receive a sthathikon from the patriarch as the order to assume their new offices.

== See also ==
- Altar stone
- Antimins
- Hanānā
- Ordinal (liturgy)
- Pontifical
