= Holy Qurobo =

Eucharist in Syriac-Antiochene Christianity

The Holy Qurobo (Classical Syriac: ܩܘܽܪܳܒܳܐ ܩܰܕܝܫܳܐ, romanized: Qūrōbō Qādīśō) or Holy Qurbono (Classical Syriac: ܩܘܽܪܒܳܢܳܐ ܩܰܕܝܫܳܐ, romanized: Qurbōnō Qādīśō, the "Holy Offering" or "Holy Sacrifice" in English) (Note: Also called Qurobo Alohoyo (Classical Syriac: ܩܘܽܪܳܒܳܐ ‍ܐܰܠܳܗܳܝܳܐ‌‌, romanized: Qūrōbō Ālōhōyō, "Divine offering" or "Divine Liturgy" in English. Some of the West Syrian Rite Churches in India often refer the Eucharist as Holy Qurbana.) refers to the Eucharist as celebrated in the West Syriac Rite and the liturgical books containing rubrics for its celebration. West Syriac Rite includes various descendants of the Oriental Orthodox and Eastern Catholic churches. It consists of two distinct liturgical traditions: the Maronite Rite, and the Jacobite Rite. The major Anaphora of both the traditions is the Divine Liturgy of Saint James in Syriac language. The Churches are primarily based in the Middle East and India.

The Maronite tradition is employed solely in the Maronite Church originating from the region of modern-day Lebanon.

The Jacobite liturgical tradition is employed by several churches that descend from the Syriac Orthodox Church based in Syria and its Catholicate of India known as Malankara Jacobite Syrian Christian Church, the Syriac Catholic Church based in Lebanon, the Malankara Orthodox Syrian Church, the Malabar Independent Syrian Church and the Syro-Malankara Catholic Church based in India.

A reformed variant of this tradition, which omits intercession to saints and prayers for the departed, is used by the Mar Thoma Syrian Church, a Reformed Oriental Church.

== Etymology ==
The Syriac word qurobo is derived from the Aramaic term qurbana (ܩܘܪܒܢܐ). When the Temple stood in Jerusalem, and sacrifices were offered, "qorban" was a technical Hebrew term for some of the offerings that were brought there. It comes from a Hebrew root, "qarab", meaning "to draw close or 'near'". A required korban was offered morning and evening daily and on holidays (at certain times, additional 'korbanot' were offered), in addition to which individuals could bring an optional personal Korban.

The Holy Qurobo is referred to as "complete" worship, since it is performed for the benefit of all members of the Church. The other sacraments are celebrated for individual members. Thus the Holy Qurobo is believed to be the sacrament that completes all the others. Hence it is called the "sacrament of perfection" or the "queen of sacraments".

A similar term Holy Qurbana is used to denote the eucharistic celebration in the East Syriac Rite also. Although the term Holy Qurbana is generally associated with the Eucharistic celebration in the East Syriac Rite, the Divine Liturgy in the West Syriac Churches based out of Kerala, in India is popularly referred to as Holy Qurbana and rarely, Holy Qurbono, due to their historical ties with the East Syriac Church which lasted until the sixteenth century.

== History ==
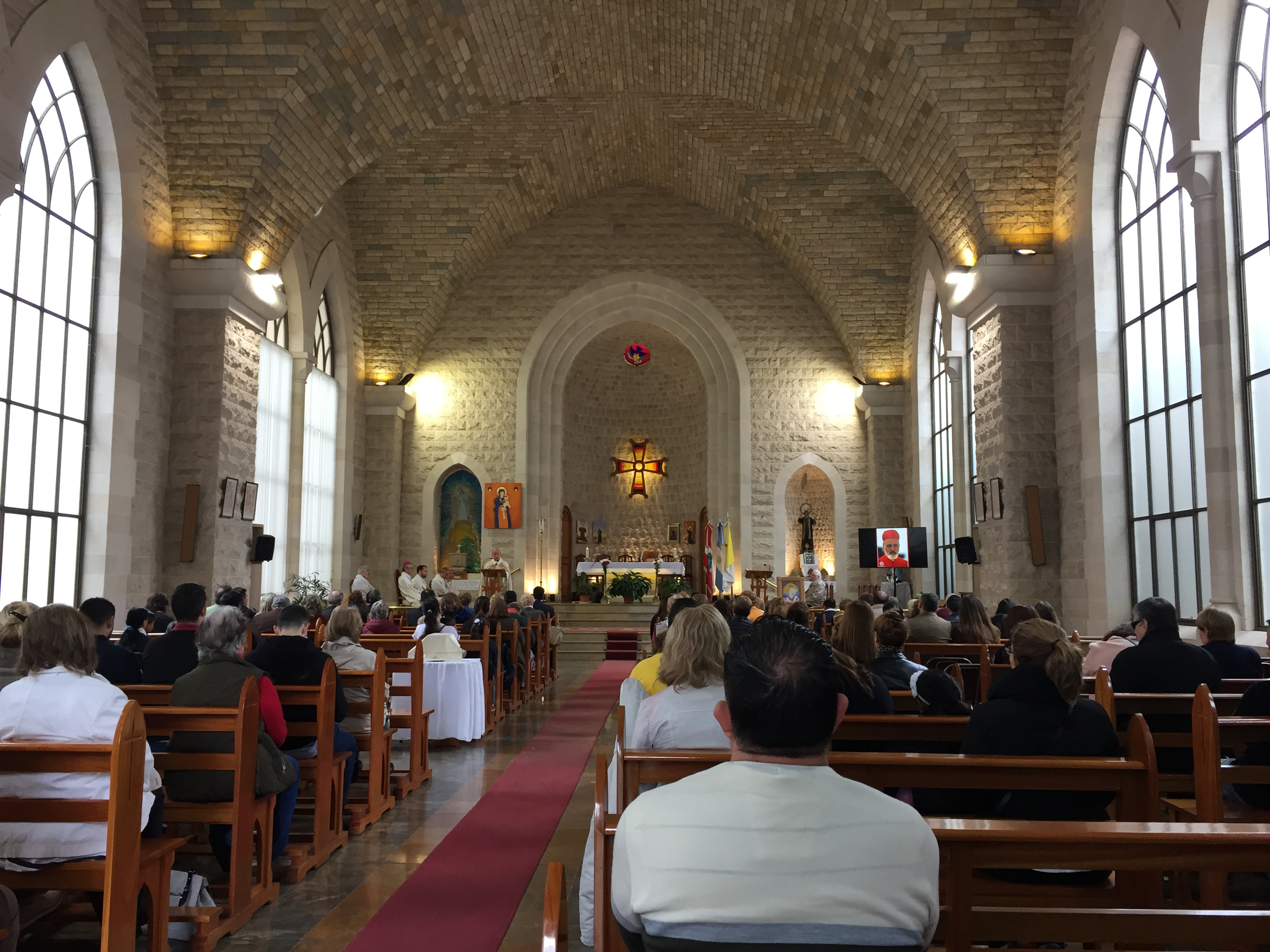
Holy Qurobo in the Maronite Church

West Syriac liturgical rite is developed out of the ancient Antiochene Rite of the Patriarchate of Antioch, adapting the old Greek liturgy into Syriac, the language of the Syrian countryside. West Syriac liturgies thus represent one of the major families in Syriac Christianity, the other being the Edessan Rite (East Syriac Rite), the liturgy of the Church of the East and its descendants.

According to historians, distinct West Syriac liturgies started developing after the Council of Chalcedon, which largely divided the Christian community in Antioch into three major factions. The Melkites, who supported the Emperor and the ecumenical council gradually adopted the Byzantine Rite. On the other side, the non-Chalcedonians (Jacobites), who rejected the council started developing their peculiar liturgical rite, the West Syriac Rite in Jacobite tradition, by translating Greek texts into Syriac. Meanwhile, a distinct West Syriac community was already growing around the monastery of Saint Maron, who eventually evolved into the Maronite Church, forming the West Syriac Rite in Maronite tradition.

For the Chalcedonian faction, the 10th and 11th centuries witnessed the notable transition from an Antiochene Melkite tradition to the liturgical rite of Constantinople. The Byzantine Rite also has its roots in the ancient Antiochene Rite. This transition was almost co-terminous with the Byzantine reconquest of parts of north Syria during 969–1084. Numerous liturgical and theological texts from Greek were massively translated into West Syriac and subsequently into Arabic, the emerging dominant language of the Levant. Several of the liturgical poetic texts, including those composed by John of Damascus, who belonged to the Melkite tradition, were subsequently taken over also into the Jacobite tradition, probably by the following century.

Sebastian P. Brock observes that it must have been from about the 7th century that the Maronite and Jacobite liturgical traditions began to diverge, with the Maronite tradition often retaining archaic elements lost in the Jacobite tradition.

The Saint Thomas Christian community of India, who originally belonged to the Province of India of the Church of the East and they were following the East Syriac Rite till the sixteenth century, when the interventions of the Portuguese Padroado missionaries led to a schism among them. Following the schism in 1665, one of the two factions that emerged (the Puthenkoor) made contact with the Syriac Orthodox Church through Archbishop Gregorios Abdal Jaleel. Links with the Syriac Orthodox Church were further strengthened in the course of time, as other Syriac Orthodox prelates continued to work among them and to replace their original liturgical rite. Maphrian Baselios Yaldo and Baselios Shakrallah were prominent among them. In this way the West Syriac liturgical tradition was gradually introduced to them, and thus the descendants of the Puthenkoor which includes the Jacobite Syrian Christian Church, Malankara Orthodox Syrian Church, Malankara Marthoma Syrian Church, Syro-Malankara Catholic Church and Malabar Independent Church currently employ the West Syriac Rite. Essentially, the West Syriac liturgical tradition that was introduced into India was the Tagrit usage of the Jacobite tradition.

== Liturgy of St James ==
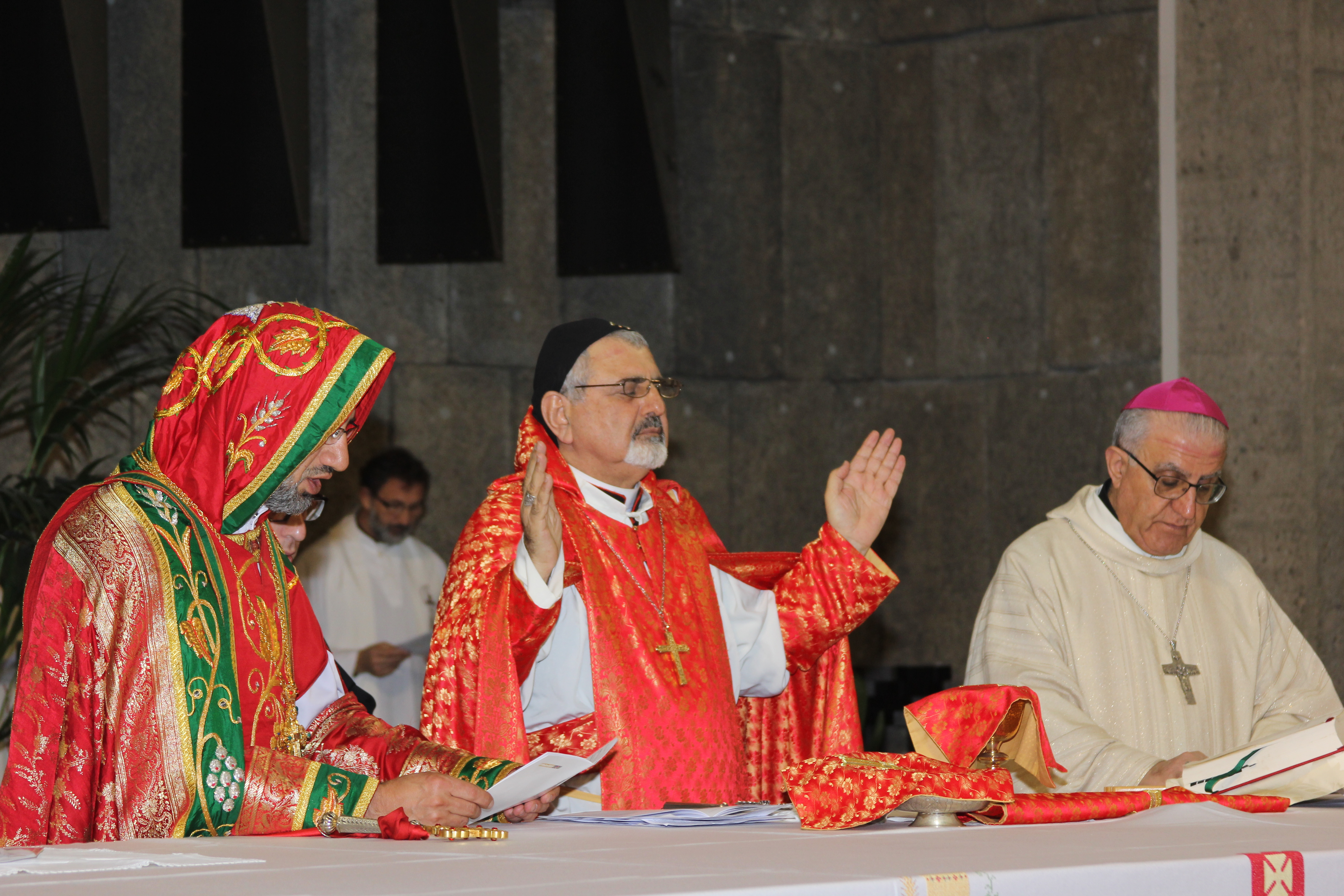
Celebration of the Holy Qurobo in the Syriac Catholic Church led by Patriarch Ignatius Joseph III Yonan

The Liturgy is related to the Mystagogic Catecheses of St Cyril of Jerusalem. The liturgy possibly dates back to the fourth century, originally composed in Greek language, while its Syriac version evolved after the fifth century, following the Chalcedonian Schism. The Liturgy is associated with the name of James the Just, the "brother" of Jesus and patriarch among the Jewish Christians at Jerusalem. Saint James was martyred at the hands of a mob incensed at his preaching about Jesus and his "transgression of the Law" - an accusation made by the Jewish High Priest of the time, Hanan ben Hanan. Among the Eastern liturgies, the Liturgy of Saint James is one of the Antiochene group of liturgies, those ascribed to Saint James, to Saint Basil, and to Saint John Chrysostom.

Most authorities propose a fourth-century date for the known form, because the anaphora seems to have been developed from an ancient Egyptian form of the Basilean anaphoric family united with the anaphora described in The Catechisms of St. Cyril of Jerusalem.

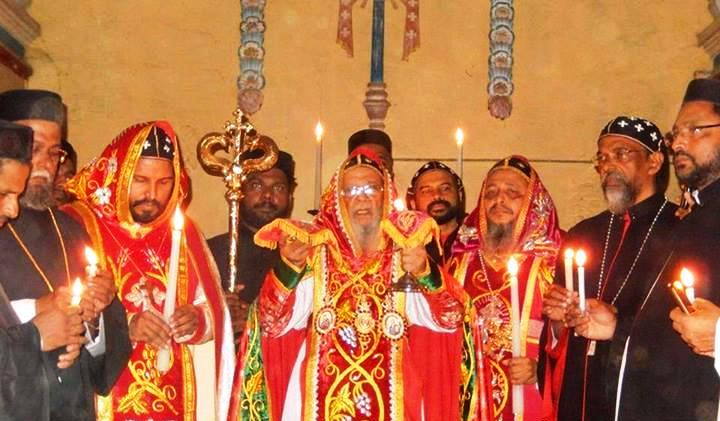
Holy Qurbono presided over by Catholicos Baselios Thomas I in the Jacobite Syrian Christian Church (Malankara Syriac Orthodox Church)

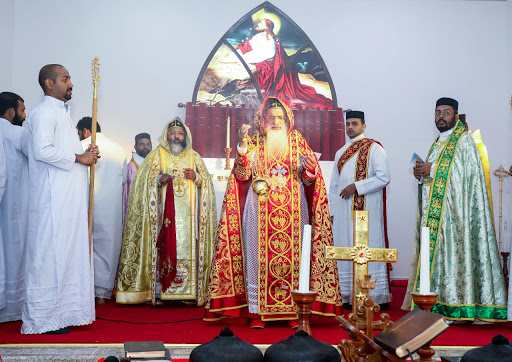
Catholicos Baselios Marthoma Paulose II of Malankara Orthodox Syrian Church celebrating Holy Qurbana (Holy Qurbono)

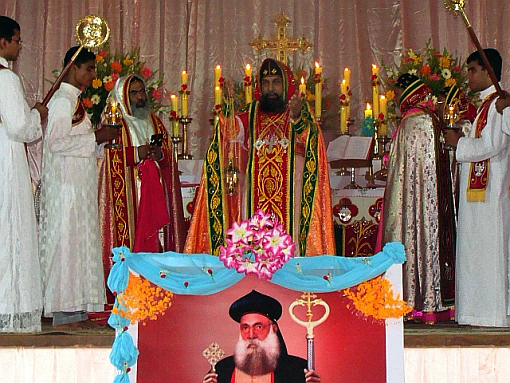
Catholicos Baselios Cleemis of the Syro-Malankara Catholic Church celebrating Holy Qurbono

A variant of the West Syriac Rite, the Malankara Rite, developed in the Malankara Church of India since the arrival of Archbishop Gregorios Abdul Jaleel in 1665 and is still used in its descendant churches. They are the Jacobite Syrian Christian Church (Malankara Syriac Orthodox Church) which is part of the Syriac Orthodox Church, the Syro-Malankara Catholic Church, a particular Church in the Catholic Communion, the Malankara Orthodox Syrian Church an Oriental Orthodox Church, the Malankara Mar Thoma Syrian Church, a reformed-oriental church in the Anglican Communion, and the Malabar Independent Syrian Church, an independent Oriental Orthodox Church in Communion with the Anglican Communion.

Although the term Holy Qurbana is generally associated with the Eucharistic celebration in the East Syriac Rite, the Divine Liturgy in the West Syriac Churches in India is popularly referred to as Holy Qurbana and rarely, Holy Qurbono, due to the historical ties with the East Syriac Church which lasted until the sixteenth century.

=== Other Anaphorae ===
The anaphorae currently used by the Syro-Antiochene Rite (or West Syriac Rite) are numerous and the main are:

- Anaphora of Twelve Apostles
- Anaphora of St. Mark the Evangelist
- Anaphora of St. Peter
- Anaphora of St. John the Evangelist
- Anaphora of St. Clement of Rome
- Anaphora of St. Julius of Rome
- Anaphora of St. Xystus of Rome
- Anaphora of St. John Chrysostom, a different anaphora from the Byzantine Rite version
- Anaphora of St. Cyril of Alexandria
- Anaphora of St. Jacob of Serugh
- Anaphora of St. Philoxenus of Mabbug
- Anaphora of St. Severus of Antioch
- Anaphora of Mar Jacob Bar-Salibi

The Antiochene Maronite Church is one of the richest in the number of anaphorae contained in its Liturgy, most of them belong to the tradition of the Antiochene rites. There are at least seventy-two Maronite Anaphorae.

== Usage ==
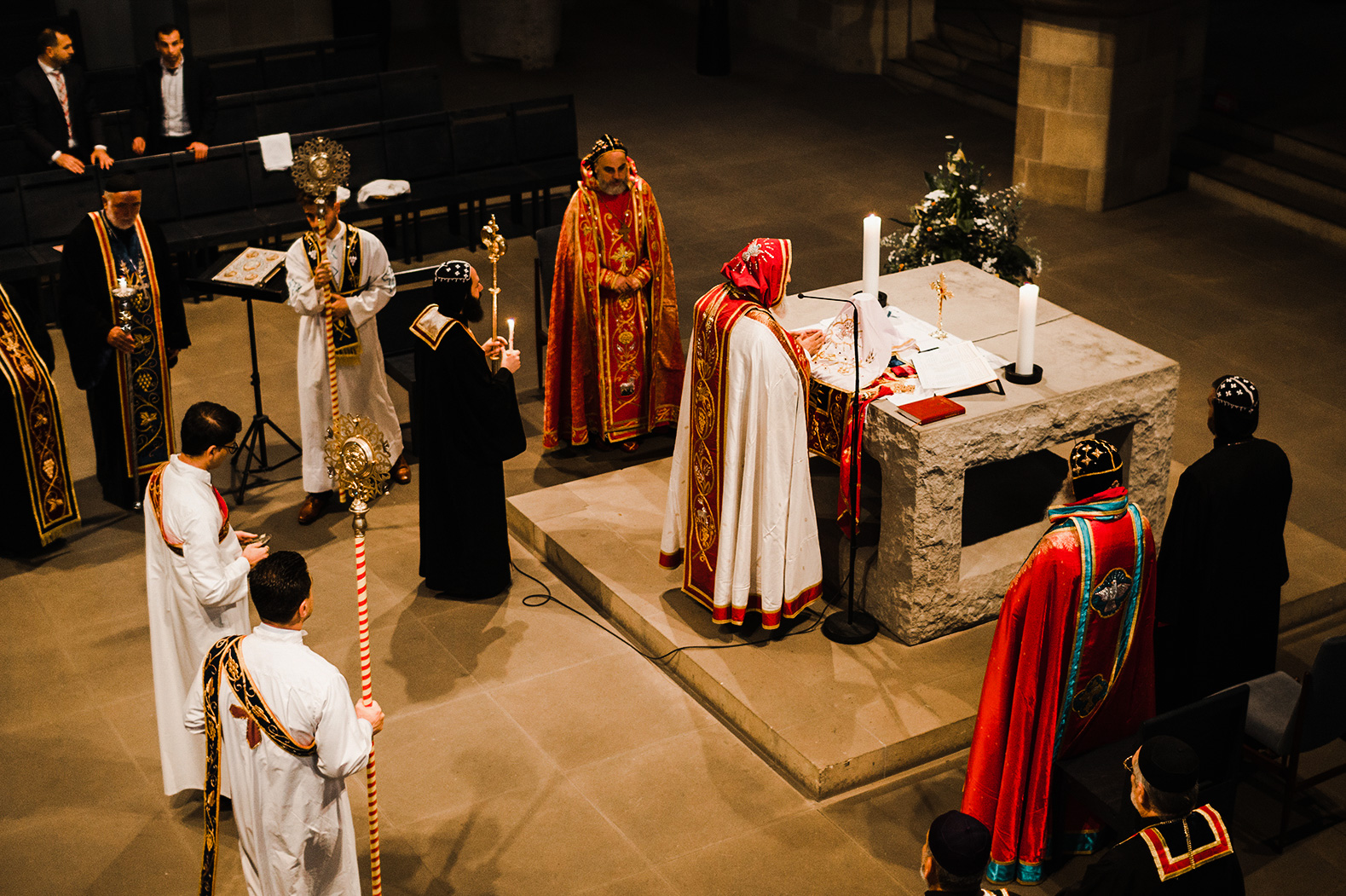
Celebration of the Holy Qurobo at St. John's Church, Stuttgart, Germany.

Liturgy of Saint James is celebrated on Sundays and special occasions. The Holy Eucharist consists of Gospel reading, Bible readings, prayers, and songs. The recitation of the Liturgy is performed according to with specific parts chanted by the presider, the lectors, the choir, and the congregated faithful, at certain times in unison. Apart from certain readings, prayers are sung in the form of chants and melodies. Hundreds of melodies remain preserved in the book known as Beth Gazo, the key reference to Syriac Orthodox church music.

The thabilitho is a wooden slab placed at the center of the altar and covered with cloth. During Holy Qurobo the paten and chalice are placed over it. It is consecrated with chrism by a bishop during the consecration of a church. The Holy Qurbono can be celebrated anywhere on a thabilitho, and cannot be celebrated without one.

== Sources ==
- Brock, Sebastian P. (2011). "Liturgy". In Sebastian P. Brock; Aaron M. Butts; George A. Kiraz; Lucas Van Rompay (eds.). Gorgias Encyclopedic Dictionary of the Syriac Heritage: Electronic Edition. Gorgias Press.
- Paniker, Givergis (1991). Thomas Paniker (ed.). The Holy Qurbono in the Syro-Malankara Church. SB Press Trivandrum.
