= Thabilitho =

In the Syriac Orthodox Church a thabilitho (also, called: tablito) is a wooden slab placed at the center of the altar and covered with cloth. During Holy Qurbono (the Eucharist) the paten and chalice are placed over it. It is consecrated with chrism by a bishop during the consecration of a church. Each thabilitho has inscribed on it in Syriac in the form of a cross the following statement: "The Holy Trinity sanctified this tablito by the hands of Mar N(Name of the Bishop) on (date month and year)." The Holy Qurbono can be celebrated anywhere on a thabilitho, and cannot be celebrated without one. The thabilitho symbolizes the Cross on which Jesus was crucified.

== See also ==
- Tabot
- Antimension
- Altar stone
- Corporal (liturgy)

== Sources ==
- Givergis Paniker Karichal (1991). Thomas Paniker (ed.). The Holy Qurbono in the Syro-Malankara Church. SB Press Trivandrum.
