= Timkat =

Epiphany celebration at Orthodox Tewahedo Church

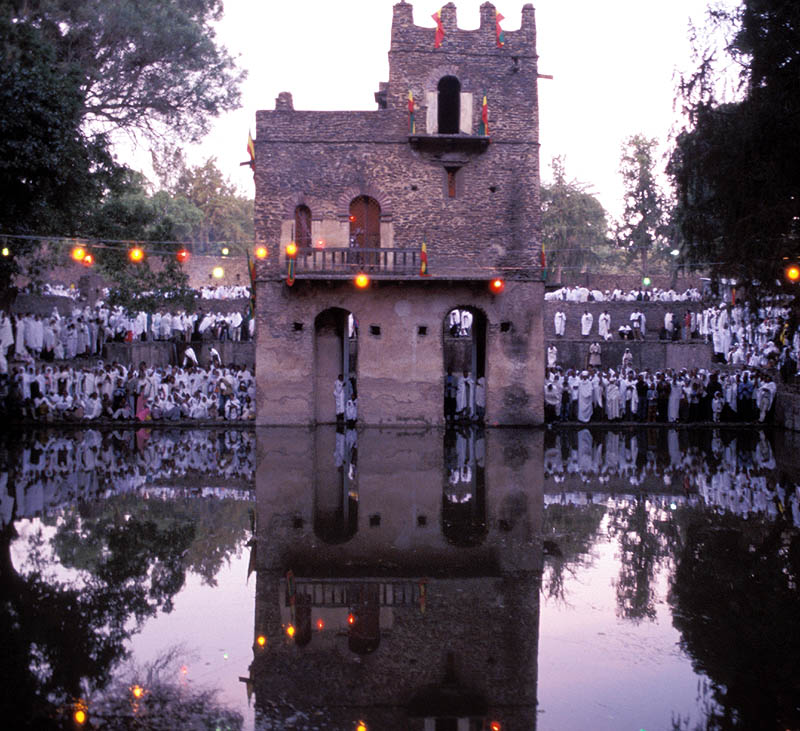
An Ethiopian Tewahedo ceremony at Fasilides' Bath in Gondar, Ethiopia, celebrating Timkat (Epiphany).

Timkat (Ge'ez: ጥምቀት T’əmqät) is an Ethiopian Orthodox Tewahedo Church and Eritrean Orthodox Tewahedo Church celebration of Epiphany. It is celebrated on 19 January (or 20 in a leap year), corresponding to the 11th day of Terr in the Ge'ez calendar.

Timkat celebrates the baptism of Jesus in the River Jordan. This festival is best known for its ritual reenactment of baptism (similar to such reenactments performed by numerous Christian the Holy Land when they visit the Jordan).

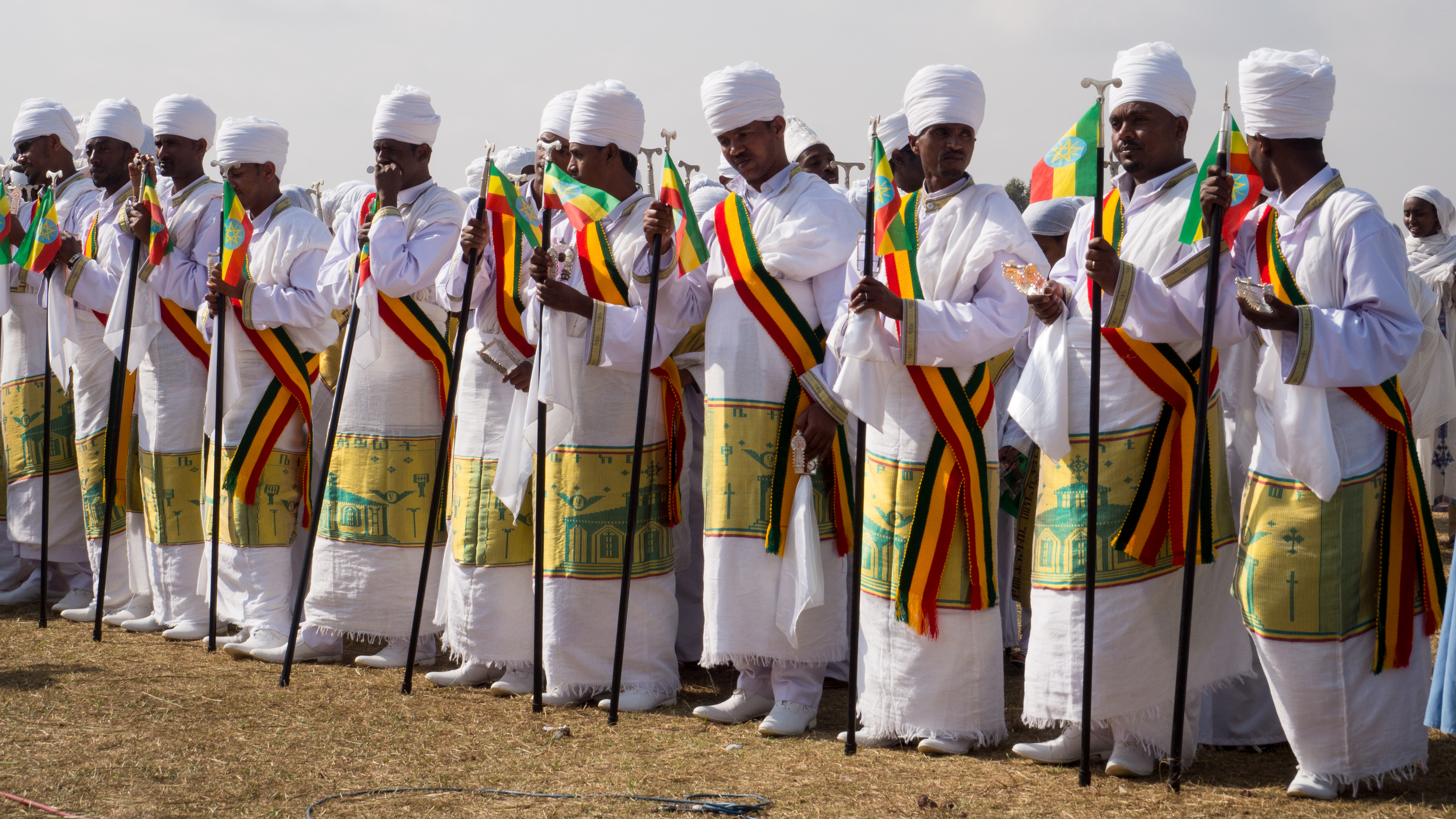
Ethiopian Tewahedo priests at a Timkat ceremony in Jan Meda.

During the ceremonies of Timkat, the Tabot, a model of the Ark of the Covenant, which is present on every Ethiopian altar (somewhat like the Western altar stone), is reverently wrapped in rich cloth and borne in procession on the head of the priest. The Tabot, which is otherwise rarely seen by the laity, represents the manifestation of Jesus as the Messiah when he came to the Jordan for baptism. The Divine Liturgy is celebrated near a stream or pool early in the morning (around 2 a.m.). Then the nearby body of water is blessed towards dawn and sprinkled on the participants, some of whom enter the water and immerse themselves, symbolically renewing their baptismal vows. But the festival does not end there; Donald N. Levine describes a typical celebration of the early 1960s:

By noon on Timqat Day a large crowd has assembled at the ritual site, those who went home for a little sleep having returned, and the holy ark is escorted back to its church in colorful procession and festivities. The clergy, bearing robes and umbrellas of many hues, perform hymns and; the elders march solemnly, attended by middle-aged men singing long-drawn, low-pitched songs and hymns in their own manner; and the children run about with activities and may participate in the services. Dressed up in their finest, the women chatter excitedly on their one real day of freedom in the year. The young braves leap up and down in spirited dances, tirelessly repeating rhythmic songs. This celebration is also registered in UNESCO as an intangible heritage. When the holy ark has been safely restored to its dwelling-place, everyone goes home for feasting. This holiday is one of the greatest holidays if not the greatest.

UNESCO inscribed Timkat in 2019 on the Representative List of the Intangible Cultural Heritage of Humanity.
