= Woybela Mariam Church incident =

2022 police attack in Addis Ababa, Ethiopia

- Location: 9.0239°N 38.6881°E; Woybela Mariam Church, Addis Ababa, Ethiopia
- Date: 20 January 2022
- Target: Congregants at feast celebration
- Weapons: Handgun; Tear gas
- Deaths: 3
- Injuries: 10

On 20 January 2022, a group of Oromia police officers fired at Ethiopian Orthodox Tewahedo followers while the congregants transporting a tabot to Woybela Mariam Church during the feast day of Saint Michael in Addis Ababa, Ethiopia, killing three people from direct gunshots, and injuring ten other people.

== Event ==
Following an altercation with congregants bearing Ethiopian flags and wearing the flag's colors, Oromia police opened fire on congregants of the Orthodox Tewahedo Church while they were transporting a tabot to Woybela Mariam Church during the feast day of Saint Michael. They threw tear gas at the children's choir to stop the ritual progression. Three people were killed by the police's gunfire while ten people were injured.

== Response ==
The event stirred up criticism directed at Abiy Ahmed's government, which was blamed for not quickly responding to the action. Abune Melke Tsadek, Archbishop of Addis Ababa, decided to temporarily keep the tabot at Keraneyo Medhanealem Church in response to the violence. In the aftermath, the Ethiopian Orthodox followers began mobilizing to resume the procession.
