= White good =

White goods may refer to:

- Major appliance, in British and Australian English
- Linens, in American English
- Pottery or whiteware, in New Zealand
