= White sale =

Marketing strategy

A white sale is a marketing strategy in which a store steeply discounts its merchandise to increase sales during a short period of time.

== Origins ==
In 1878, John Wanamaker of Philadelphia department store fame decreed January to be the time for a "White sale". Bed linens, which were available in white only, were sold at a discount. This was done to increase sales for these items at a time of the year when sales were normally slow.

== Today ==
Today, white sales usually revolve around household items. However, they no longer only involve items that are white in color, and they are not restricted to take place in the month of January. "White sales" should not be confused with sales on "white goods", which is to say durable goods such as refrigerators, freezers, stoves, washing machines, and similar large appliances.
