= Burse =

Burse is a surname. Notable people with the surname include:

- Charlie Burse (1901–1965), African-American blues musician
- Denise Burse (born 1952), American actress
- Isaiah Burse (born 1991), American football wide receiver
- Janell Burse (born 1979), American, women's basketball player
- Ray Burse (born 1984), American soccer goalkeeper
- Raymond Burse, college administrator, lawyer and businessman
- Tony Burse (born 1965), American football player
- Walter Burse (1898–1970), second president of Suffolk University

== See also ==
- Corporal (liturgy), which is required to be stored in a case named a burse
- Bourse (disambiguation)
- Bursa
- Purse (disambiguation)
