= Xavier Barbier de Montault =

French writer and historian

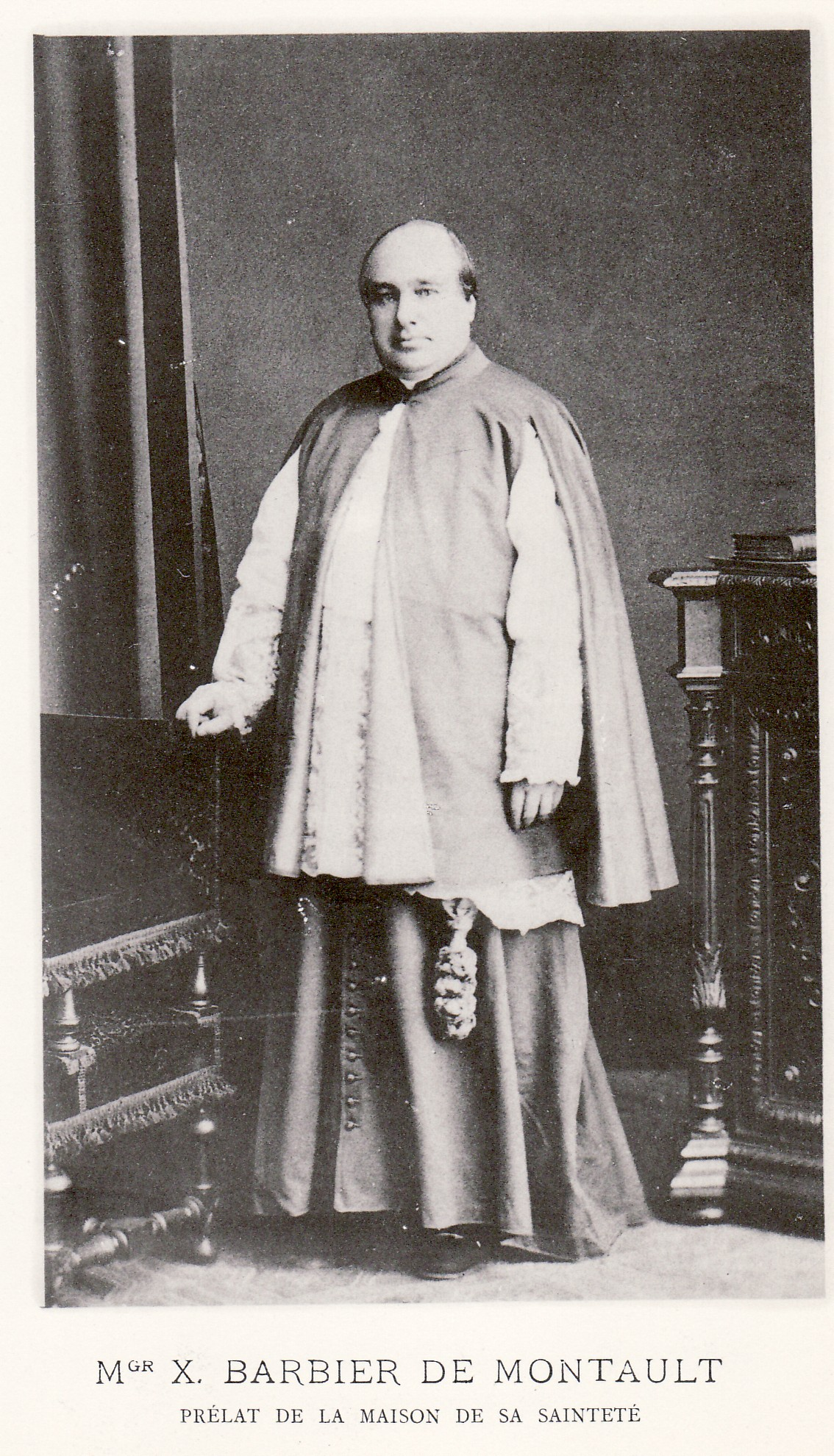
Xavier Barbier de Montault.

Xavier Barbier de Montault (6 February 1830 – 29 March 1901) was a French writer on Catholic Church history, liturgy and antiquities.

== Life ==
He was born at Loudun, of a noble family. When only eight years old, he was confided to the care of his great-uncle, Charles Montault des Isles, Bishop of Angers. He studied theology at the Seminary of St. Sulpice, and went to Rome to continue his studies in theology and archaeology at the Sapienza and the Roman College. After four years his health obliged him to return to France (1857), where he was appointed historiographer of the Diocese of Angers. He searched the archives of the diocese, studied its inscriptions and monuments, and founded a diocesan museum, a project in which Arcisse de Caumont took a lively interest. Another sojourn of fourteen years in Rome (1861–75) enabled him to augment his knowledge of liturgy and Christian antiquities.

He was canonical consultor to different French bishops, and at the First Vatican Council acted as theologian to Mgr Desflèches. He died, aged 71, at Blaslay, Vienne, France.

== Works ==
His first archæological study appeared in 1851 in the "Annales archéologiques", and Adolphe Napoléon Didron assigned him the task of making an index for this publication. Barbier de Montault was one of the most prolific contributors to the "Revue de l'art chrétien" from the inception of this periodical, his articles continuing to appear until 1903 (two years after his death).

He also wrote numerous articles for other reviews as well as several separate works on iconography, ecclesiastical furniture, liturgy, canon law, etc. In 1889 he began to reprint his scattered works, classifying them according to subjects. This publication was to comprise sixty volumes, but went no further than the sixteenth.

- "Œuvres complètes" (unfinished): I. "Inventaires ecclésiastiques"; II. "Le Vatican"; III. "Le Pape"; IV-V. "Droit papal"; VI-VIII. "Dévotions populaires"; IX-XVI. "Hagiographie" (Rome, 1889–1902);
- "Traité d'iconographie chrétienne" (2 vols., Paris, 1890);
- "Collection des décrets authentiques des ss. congregations romaines" (8 vols., Rome, 1872).
