= Tabot =

Ethiopian Orthodox Church Eucharistic object

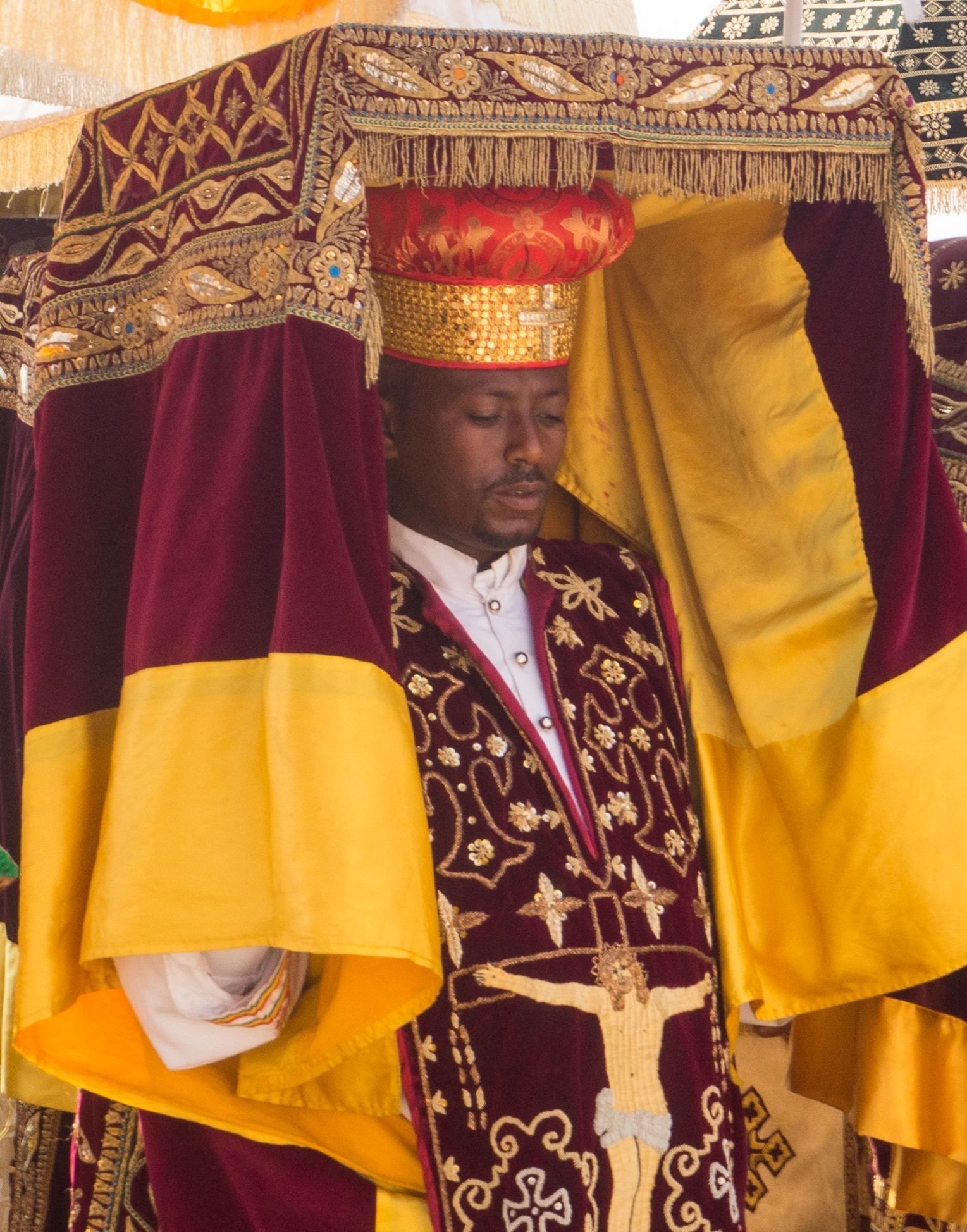
An Ethiopian priest carries a tabot during a Timket ceremony.

Tabot (Ge'ez: ታቦት, romanized: tābōt, sometimes spelled tabout) is a replica of the Ark of the Covenant, and represents the presence of God, in Ethiopian Orthodox and Eritrean Orthodox Churches. Tabot may variously refer to an inscribed altar tablet (tsellat or tsilit; Ge'ez: ጽላት tsallāt, modern ṣellāt), the chest in which this tablet is stored (menbere-tabot, or throne of the tabot), or to the tablet and chest together.

According to Edward Ullendorff, the Geʽez word tabot is derived from Aramaic תיבותא tēḇoṯā, like Hebrew תיבה tēḇā. Ullendorff stated that "The concept and function of the tabot represent one of the most remarkable areas of agreement with Old Testament forms of worship."

== Description ==
The tsellat is usually a 15-centimetre (6-inch) square, and may be made from alabaster, marble or wood from an acacia tree, although longer lengths of upwards of 40 cm (16 inches) are also common. This tablet is inscribed with the name of Jesus, and that of the saint to whom it is dedicated.

A bishop consecrates the tabot (not the church building itself), and every church must have at least one tabot in order to conduct the liturgy. The tabot is kept in the church's Holy of Holies (Qidduse Qiddusan or Bete Mekdes), where only the clergy may enter, and it is wrapped in ornate cloths to conceal it from public view. Only bishops and priests are allowed touch or handle a tabot, or see it without its coverings. If a layperson touches a tabot, a bishop must reconsecrate it before a church may use it again.

The Eucharist is administered from the tabot. During church festivals, such as the patronal feast day or during Timkat (known as Epiphany in English), the priests carry the tabot around the church courtyard in an elaborate procession reminiscent of 2 Samuel, chapter 6, in which King David leads the people dancing before the Ark. David Buxton describes one such procession, on the festival of Gebre Menfes Kidus:

To the uninstructed onlooker the climax of the service came at the end, when the tabot or ark was brought out, wrapped in coloured cloths, carried on the head of a priest. As it appeared in the doorway the women raised the ilil, a prolonged and piercing cry of joy. When the tabot goes out of the Bete Mekdes ቤተ መቅደስ, everyone goes down to the floor and says a prayer. At first the tabot remained motionless, accompanied by several processional crosses and their attendant brightly colored canopies, while a group of cantors (dabtara) performed the liturgical dance so beloved of the Abyssinians. The dancing over, a procession formed up, headed by the tabot, and slowly circled the church three times in a counter-clockwise direction. Finally the tabot was carried back into the sanctuary; all was over and the assembly broke up. Now in modern times Tabot comes out each time there is a celebration, for example on Jesus' Baptism all churches from the area come together with their tabot and celebrate.

== Looting and repatriation of tabots ==
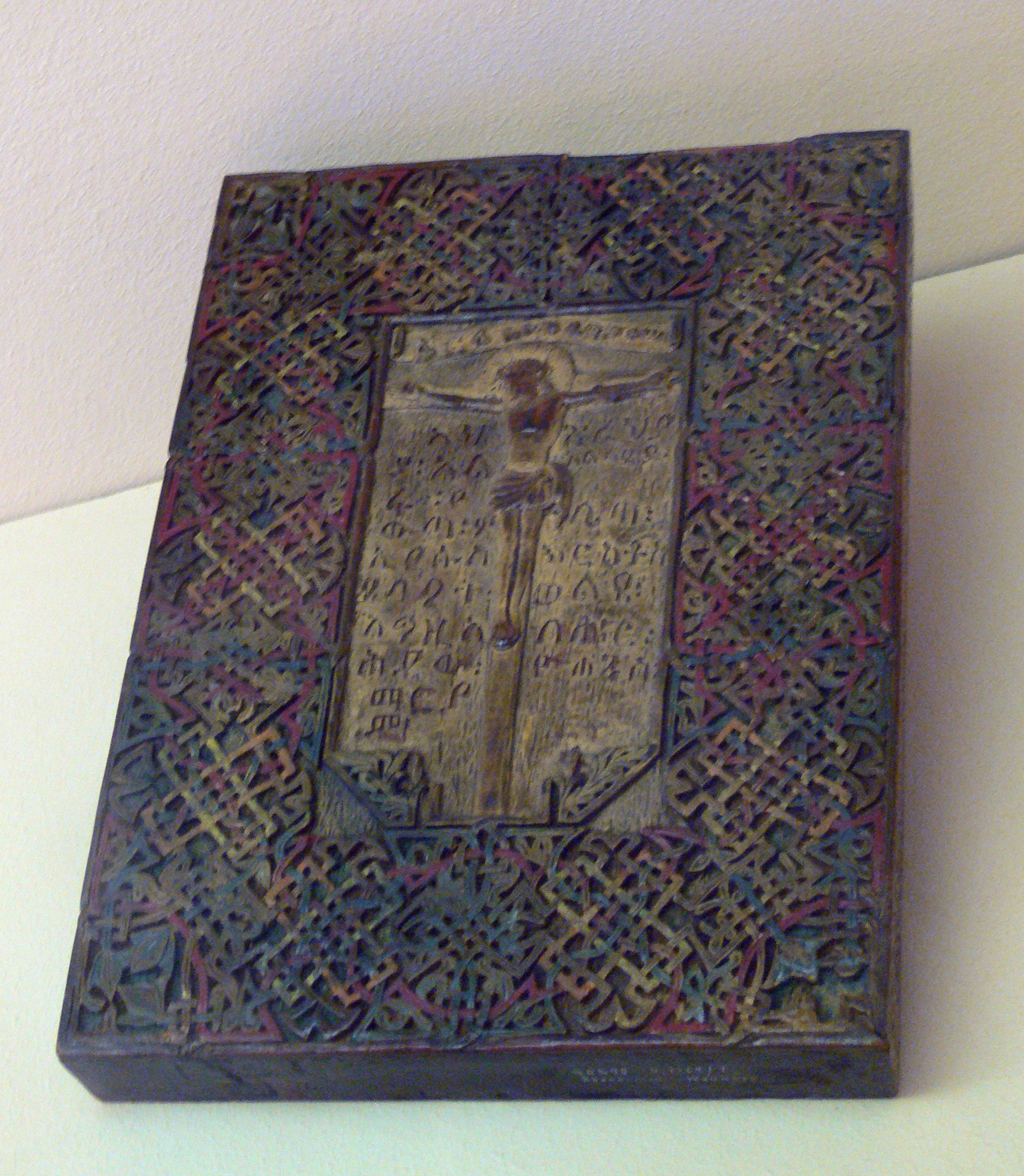
An uncovered tabot at the Linden Museum in Stuttgart (2008).

Although Ethiopia was never colonised by the British, many tabots were looted by British soldiers during the 1868 Expedition to Abyssinia, also known as the Battle of Magdala, and is a cause of anger among Ethiopians. One of these tabots was purchased in the aftermath of the battle by British Museum employee Richard Holmes on behalf of the museum while the museum received further tabots from the Indian office. The tabots in the holdings of the British museum have had their viewing, since 2004, limited to Ethiopian Orthodox clergy

The return in February 2002 of one looted tabot, discovered in the storage of St John's Episcopal Church in Edinburgh, was a cause of public rejoicing in Addis Ababa. Another was returned in 2003 after Ian McLennan recognised the ancient tabot at an auction in London. He bought it and donated it to the government of Ethiopia.

In February 2024, the Dean of Westminster Abbey agreed in principle to return the tabot which is sealed inside an altar in Westminster Abbey to Ethiopia. This is dependent on the consent of the Royal Household as the Monarch has jurisdiction over the Abbey.

== See also ==
- Thabilitho
- Altar Stone
- Antimension
