= Bursa (liturgy) =

Pouch in which a small folded altar linen is stored

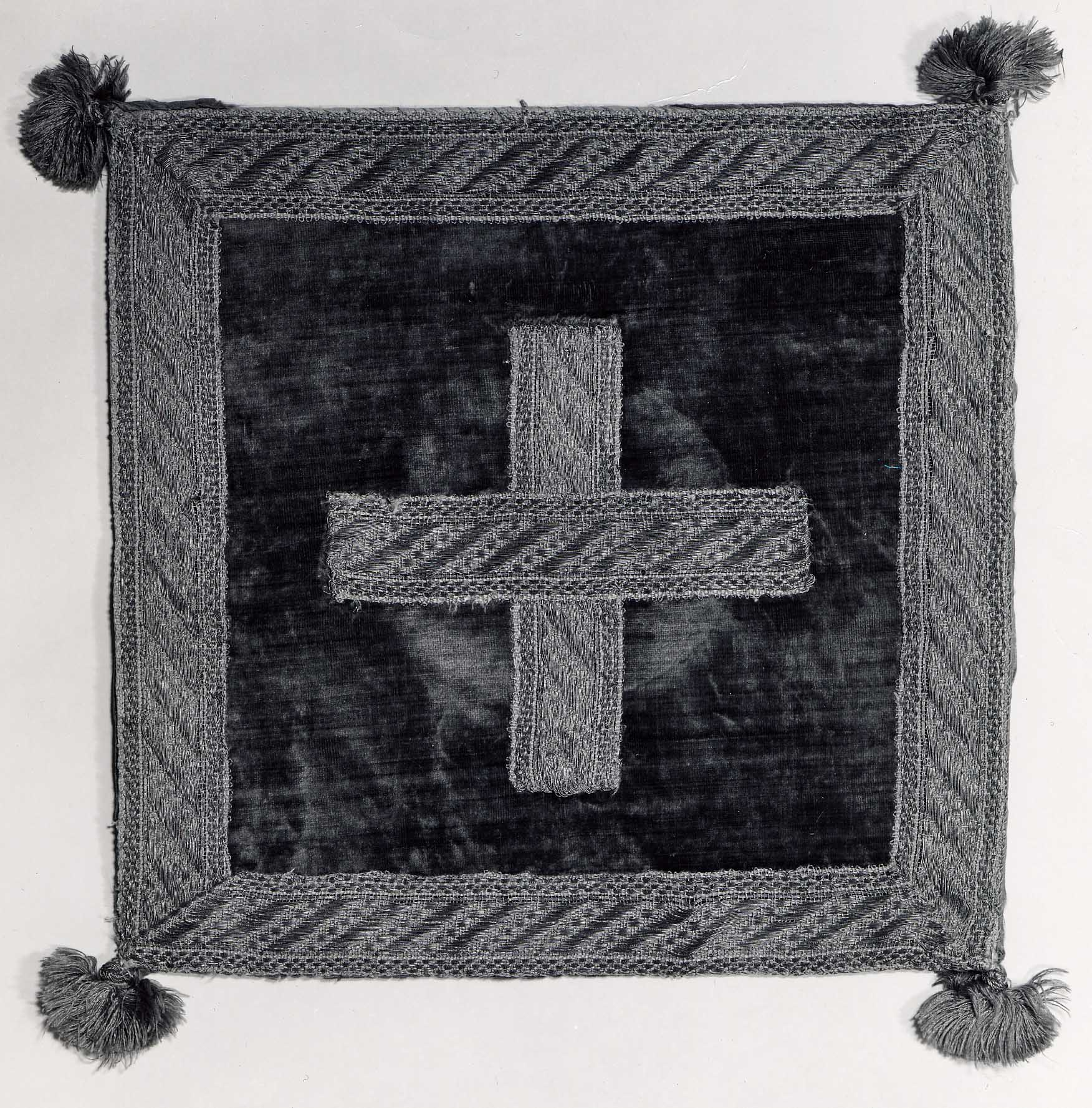
A Spanish bursa, made from silk and linen

A bursa (or burse), from Greek βύρσα ("hide", "skin", "bag"), is a parament about twelve inches square in which the folded corporal is kept in for reasons of reverence. It is used in the liturgy of the Roman Catholic Church, Anglo-Catholic churches, and the Lutheran churches. Until reforms to the Mass following the Second Vatican Council, when it fell out of use in many places, the bursa was carried by the priest to the altar when he entered for Mass. It is placed upon the chalice at the beginning and end of the Mass, and on the altar at benediction.

Usually, the bursa was made from two pieces of cardboard which were bound together at three edges; the fourth was open to receive the corporal. The two halves of the bursa are sewn together on one side and tied with ties or gussets on two sides to prevent the corporal from falling out. The outer side of the bursa has the same liturgical color of the day and occasionally the same ornamentation as the vestments and the other paraments. A cross or the nomen sacrum IHS may be embroidered on the top. The insides were lined with linen or silk.
