= Consecration in Eastern Christianity =

Consecrations in Eastern Christianity can refer to either the Sacred Mystery (Sacrament) of Cheirotonea (Ordination through laying on of hands) of a bishop, or the sanctification and solemn dedication of a church building. It can also (more rarely) be used to describe the change of the bread and wine into the Body and Blood of Christ at the Divine Liturgy. The Chrism used at Chrismation and the Antimension placed on the Holy Table are also said to be consecrated.

== Consecration of bishops ==
Eastern Christians believe their bishops to be in apostolic succession, and that at their ordination they receive the fullness of the Divine Grace of the Priesthood (priests and deacons function as the "hands" of the Bishop and are thus an extension of his ministry). The office of bishop is the highest rank in the Church. In their priesthood and bestowed Divine Grace all bishops are equal, and although certain bishops may receive titles such as Patriarch, Metropolitan, or Archbishop, such titles constitute marks of dignity and honor, but not any higher order in the Church or greater measure of grace. At his Ordination, a bishop receives grace to perform all the Sacred Mysteries, including Ordination of others.

The Scriptural foundation for electing and consecration by laying on of hands is found in the Acts of the Apostles (Acts 1:15–26; Acts 6:2–6) and the Epistles to Timothy (1 Timothy 4:14; 2 Timothy 1:6). Just as in Acts there were two stages involved: (a) election and (b) the prayerful laying on of hands, so the Ordination of a bishop in the Eastern Church takes place in two stages: (Note: Saint Clement of Alexandria in his Stromata says that the election is the work of men, but the ordination is the work of God.)

- Election—In the Early Church, bishops were elected by the entire local church over which they were to preside. Bishops in neighboring dioceses would assemble the local clergy and laity, and all together would elect the new bishop. It should not be thought, however, that such elections were merely democratic—the emphasis was upon consensus rather than majority rule—and election by acclamation was not unheard of. In time, with the danger of so sacred an undertaking descending into base electoral politics, it became the custom for episcopal nominations to be performed by a Synod of bishops. In the Early Church a bishop could be married, but the danger arose of episcopal dynasties forming. So with the rise of monasticism in the 4th century, it became customary to choose bishops from among the monks. Episcopal celibacy became a canon of the Church at the Sixth Ecumenical Council, but subsequently the requirement became not merely celibacy, but specifically being a monk, and so when a non-monastic is elected to the episcopate, he is tonsured a monk before consecration. One who is not a priest, or in Holy Orders at all, may be elected a bishop, but if so, he must be ordained a deacon (Note: He may be blessed as a Reader and Subdeacon on the same day he is ordained to the diaconate.) and then priest; (Note: (each successive Ordination—deacon, priest, bishop—must be performed on separate days)) also, he is typically elevated to the rank of archimandrite.
  - The person elected to the episcopate must voluntarily accept his nomination before the consecration can proceed.
- Cheirotonia—Because the Acts of the Apostles describes the Cheirotonia being accomplished with prayer, the Consecration is always performed in the context of the Divine Liturgy. Normally, this occurs on a Sunday or Feast Day which has an All-Night Vigil. During the Vigil (or before the beginning of the Divine Liturgy), the bishop-elect must make a formal and public Profession of Faith to ensure the orthodoxy of his belief (see the article on orlets for a more detailed description of this procedure). During the Divine Liturgy, after the Trisagion the bishop-elect kneels before the Holy Table, touching his forehead to the Holy Table, and the Gospel Book is opened and laid, with the writing down, upon his neck. All of the consecrating bishops place their hands on the Gospel and say the Prayer of Consecration, during which the Holy Spirit is believed to descend upon the new bishop and imparts the grace of the episcopate upon him. The bishop is then clothed in the vestments of a bishop and presented to the people. The ancient participation of the laity in the election of bishops is retained in their triple acclamation of Axios ("He is worthy") at the time the Omophorion is placed on the new bishop's shoulders.
  - According to the Canon I of the Apostolic Canons, a bishop must be consecrated by at least two or three bishops. Typically, there are three or more consecrating bishops.

== Consecration of a church ==
The Greek words meaning ‘dedicate’ and ‘dedication’ are not easy to translate into English, since they also have the connotation of ‘newness’, ‘renewal’. The opening Stichera for Vespers, for example, make frequent play on the ideas of ‘new’ and ‘old’. David, in Psalm 51:10, asks God to ‘renew a right Spirit within me’, rather than ‘dedicate a right Spirit’.

The Consecration of a Church is a complex service filled with many profound symbolisms. Many biblical elements taken from the Consecration of the Tabernacle (Exodus 40) and the Temple of Solomon (1 Kings 8; 2 Chronicles 5–7) are employed in the service. According to Eastern theology, once a building has been Consecrated as a church, it may never again be used for any secular purpose.

No one may construct an Eastern church without the blessing of the local bishop. Before construction begins on a new church, the bishop or his representative lays a foundation stone which may or may not contain relics of a saint. Only after all construction on the new church has been completed may it be Consecrated.

The Eastern ritual for the Consecration of a Church is modeled on the ritual of Baptism and Chrismation. Before the Consecration begins, there is a Great Blessing of Waters as is served at Theophany; (Note: Both the Greater and the Lesser Blessing of Waters are patterned after the Eastern rite of Baptism.) Chrism, white robes, and tapers are used during the service (the bishop will wear a special white linen garment over his vestments, called a savanon). A procession goes three times around the church building, just like a similar triple procession around the font at Baptism. Another symbolism which occurs frequently in the service is the Incarnation, Passion and Resurrection of Christ.

Relics of Saints (preferably martyrs) are placed in the Holy Table during the Consecration (Revelation 6:9). This is a continuation of the practice of the ancient Church of celebrating the Liturgy over the tombs of the Martyrs.

The Consecration should be performed by the diocesan bishop; but if he is unable to do so, the bishop may delegate an Archimandrite or other senior priest to perform the service in his behalf. The bishop himself must consecrate the Antimension (see below) and send it with the priest who will be performing the service. In this case, the rite of Consecration is briefer than normal. There is no Consecration of the Antimension (since the bishop himself accomplished this earlier), and no Relics are placed in the Holy Table.

There are a number of differences between the rite of Consecration as practiced by the Greeks and as practiced by the Slavic churches. Generally, the Greek rite presumes that the Holy Table will be made of stone, while the Slavic presumes it will be made of wood.

In the Syriac Orthodox Church, the altars are invariably used to be consecrated with the name of St. Mary before the prayer to all the other saints. This type of veneration concerns with the so-called hyperdulia.

== Divine Liturgy ==
If the term "Consecration" is used to refer to the change of the Eucharistic elements (bread and wine) into the actual Body and Blood of Christ, the Eastern Christians emphasize that the Consecration is the Divine response to the Epiclesis, in which the priest invokes the Holy Spirit to come down upon the Gifts and change them. Unlike the prevailing opinion in the West, the Eastern Christians do not hold that there is one specific moment at which this "change" takes place; it is a Sacred Mystery, which begins with the Prothesis (see Liturgy of Preparation). Instead, Eastern Christians would say only that the change is completed at the Epiclesis (rather than at the Words of Institution).

While Eastern Christian declarations have used the term "transubstantiation" (in Greek, "metousiosis") to refer to the change, Eastern Christians often avoid this term, regarding it as an attempt to explain the unexplainable. The shared faith of East and West is "that" the elements are changed, but "how" they are changed is Mystery. The Latin Church too holds that the manner in which the change occurs "surpasses understanding".

== Chrism ==
Sacred Chrism (Myron) is used for the Chrismation (Confirmation) of the faithful after Baptism. In the Eastern Church the Sacred Mystery of Chrismation is performed immediately after Baptism. Persons from other Christian confessions who are not received into the Church by Baptism may be admitted by Chrismation (depending upon the regulations of the jurisdiction). (Note: All Chrismated members of the Church are admitted to Holy Communion, even infants.) Apostates who have left the Church and then repented and returned are restored after appropriate penance to full communion through Chrismation. (Note: Thus, while Baptism may not be repeated, Chrismation may be repeated.) Chrism is also used in the Consecration of the Holy Table and the entire church building, and is used to anoint the Relics of the Martyrs before they are placed in the Holy Table, and to Consecrate the Antimension. In the past, Chrism was used at the Anointing of Eastern Emperors and Kings.

In the early church, after an individual was Baptized, one of the Apostles would then lay hands upon them and they would receive the Holy Spirit (Acts 8:14–17). According to Eastern Christian Tradition, as the Church grew it became impossible for the Apostles to go to each convert personally, so the Apostles laid their hands upon a vessel of oil, consecrating it, and the oil was distributed to the various churches so that all could receive the gift of the Holy Spirit. Whenever new Chrism is consecrated, it is added to the existing stock. The Eastern Church believes that the same Chrism consecrated by the Apostles is still in use today, having been added-to by all generations of the Church. The earliest mention of the use of Chrism is by Saint Hippolytus of Rome (†235).

While any bishop is empowered to Consecrate the Chrism, so long as he adds to the existing stock; in practice the Consecration is reserved to the Primates who preside over the local autocephalous churches. Traditionally, the Consecration of Chrism occurs during Holy Week. The preparation of the Chrism begins on Great Monday, using a recipe based upon the Anointing Oil consecrated by Moses (Exodus 30:22) Then, on Great Thursday the Patriarch or Metropolitan will consecrate the Chrism. Chrism is not consecrated every year, but only according to need. The Patriarch or Metropolitan will normally make a formal announcement beforehand when there is going to be a Consecration of Chrism.

== Antimins ==
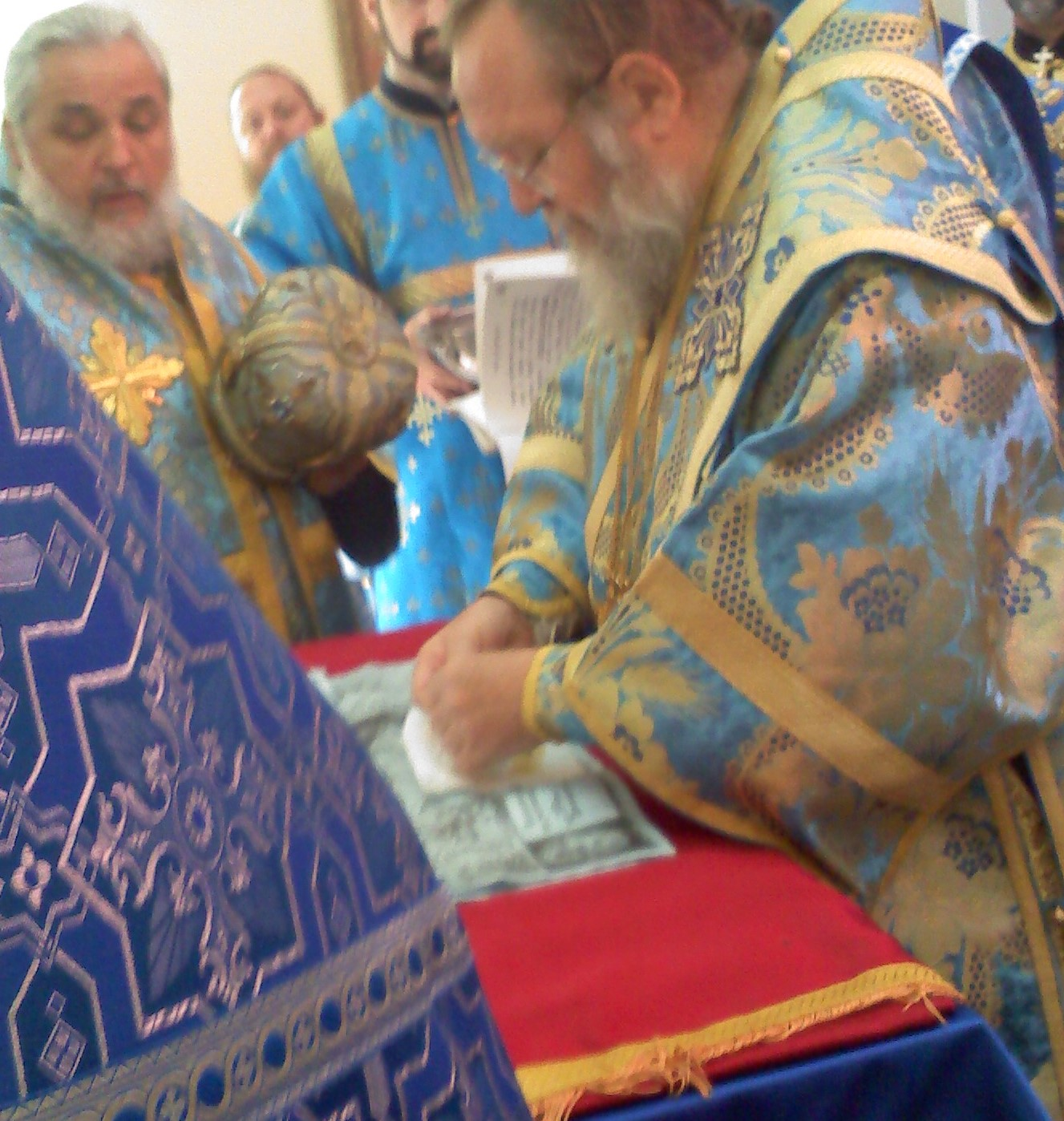
Commencing the consecration of an antimension, the bishop unfolds the relics lying on the antimension being consecrated to sew into it.

The Antimins (literally, "In place of the Table") is a piece of cloth, often silk, that has depicted on it Christ laid out for burial with Icons of the four Evangelists in the corners. (Note: The Antimins bears some similarities to both the Corporal and the Altar stone of the pre-Vatican II Roman Catholic Church.)

== Also ==
- Christian laying on of hands
