= Manuterge =

Liturgic towel in the Catholic Church

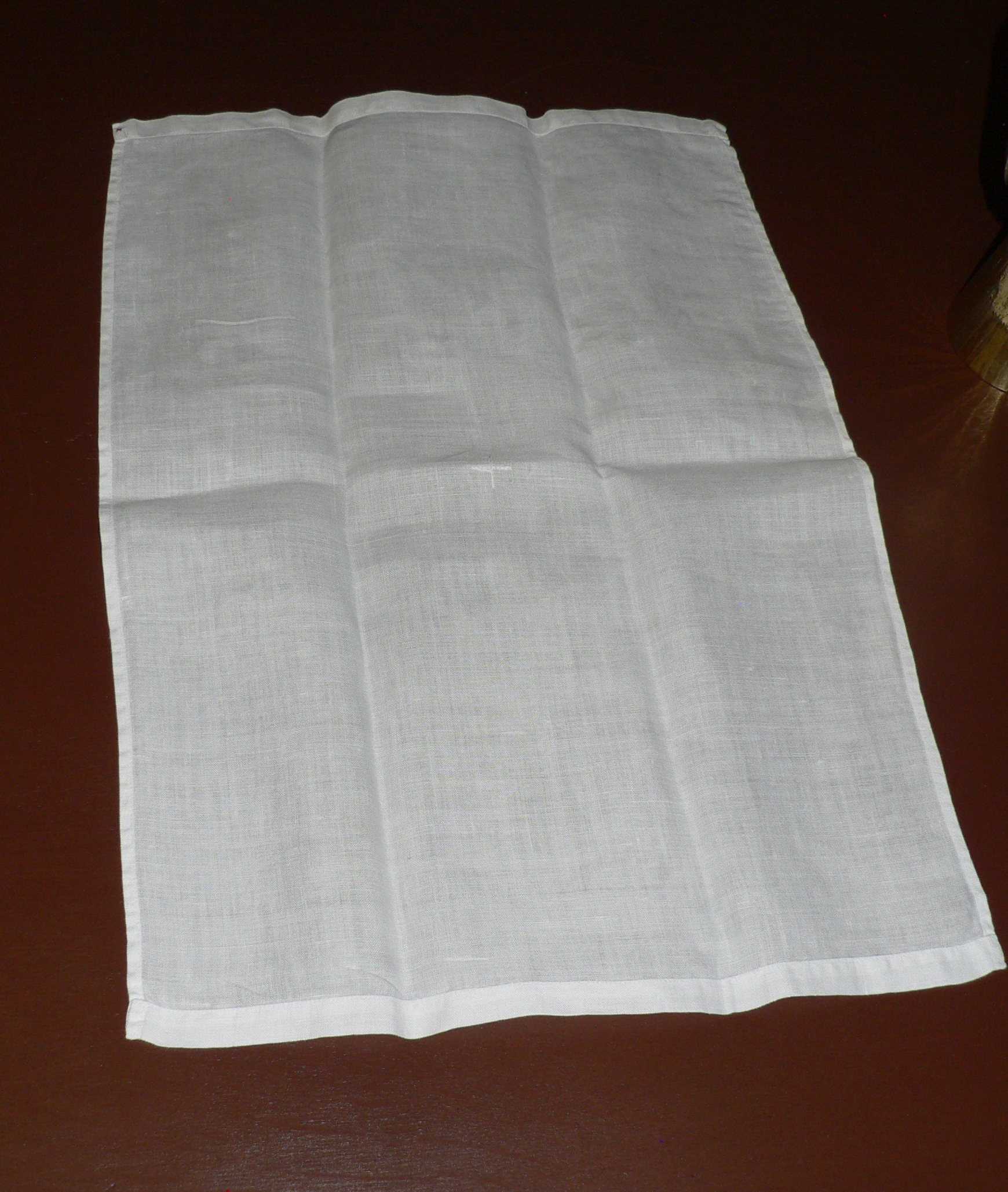
A manuterge for use at the Lavabo.

Manuterge is the name given by the Roman Catholic Church to the towel used by the priest when engaged liturgically.

== Description ==
There are two kinds of manuterges. One serves the needs of the sacristy, as a priest uses this at the washing of hands before Mass, before distributing Communion outside of Mass, and before administering baptism. It can also be used for drying the hands after they have been washed on occasions not prescribed by the rubrics, but still customary after Mass. There are no prescriptions as to material and form for the towel used in the sacristy, and it is usual to have it hanging on a roller, the two ends having been sewn together to form a circular band. The custom of washing the hands before Mass may date from Early Christian tradition since the ceremony is expressly mentioned in sacramentaries of the ninth and tenth centuries.

The other manuterge is used in the Mass for drying both the hands at the Lavabo, an action performed by the priest after the Offertory as he recites the Psalm Lavabo (Psalm 26:6–12 in the KJV; Psalm 25 in the Septuagint) and also by the bishop before the Offertory and after the Communion. It is kept on the credence table with the finger-bowl and cruets. There are also no ecclesiastical regulations as to the form and material of this manuterge, but it is usually small (18 in. by 14 in.) as only the points of the thumb and two fingers are usually washed. It is commonly decorated at the ends with lace or embroidery.
