= Corporal (liturgy) =

White linen cloth used in Catholic Mass

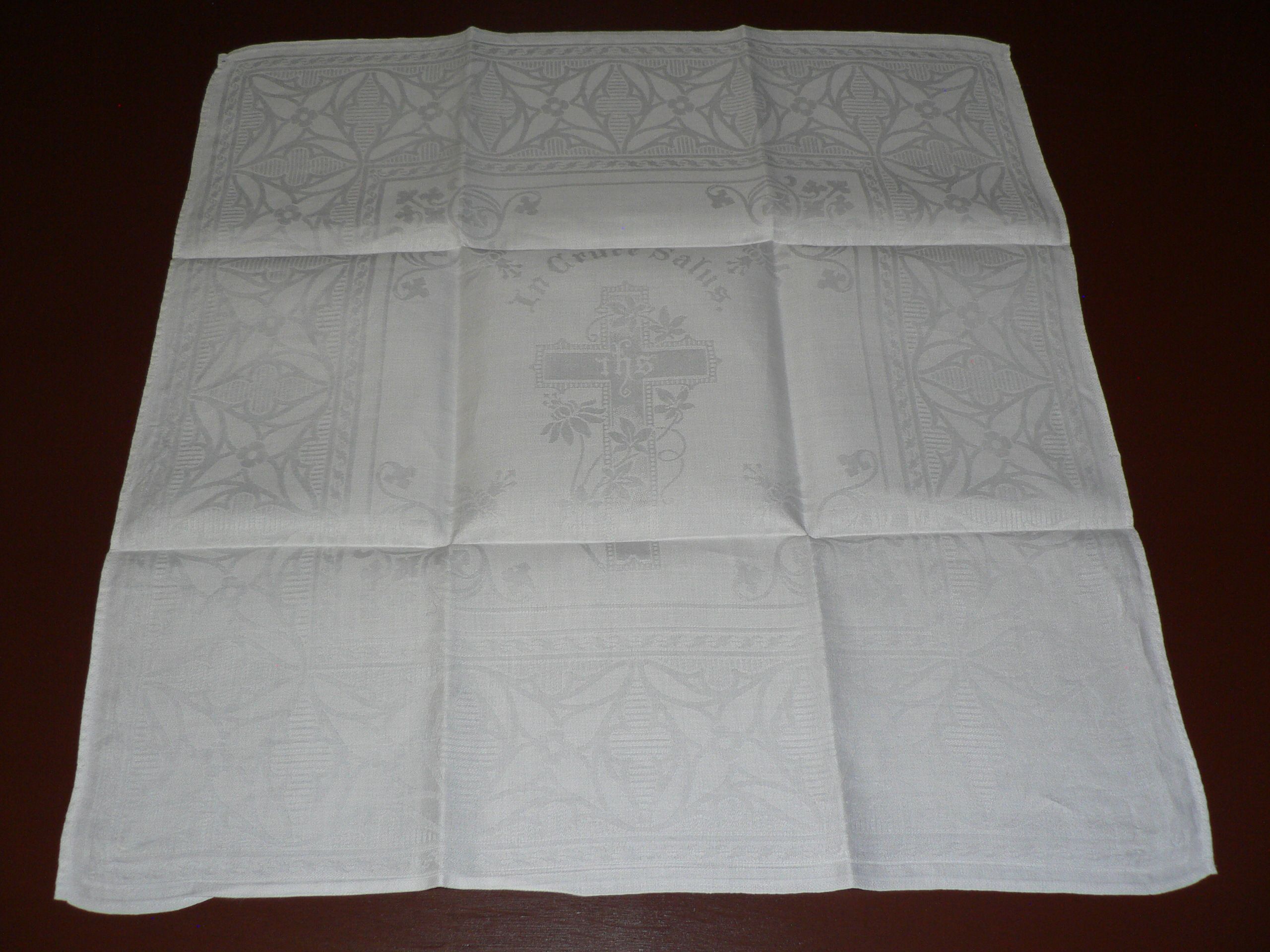
A corporal, fully opened.

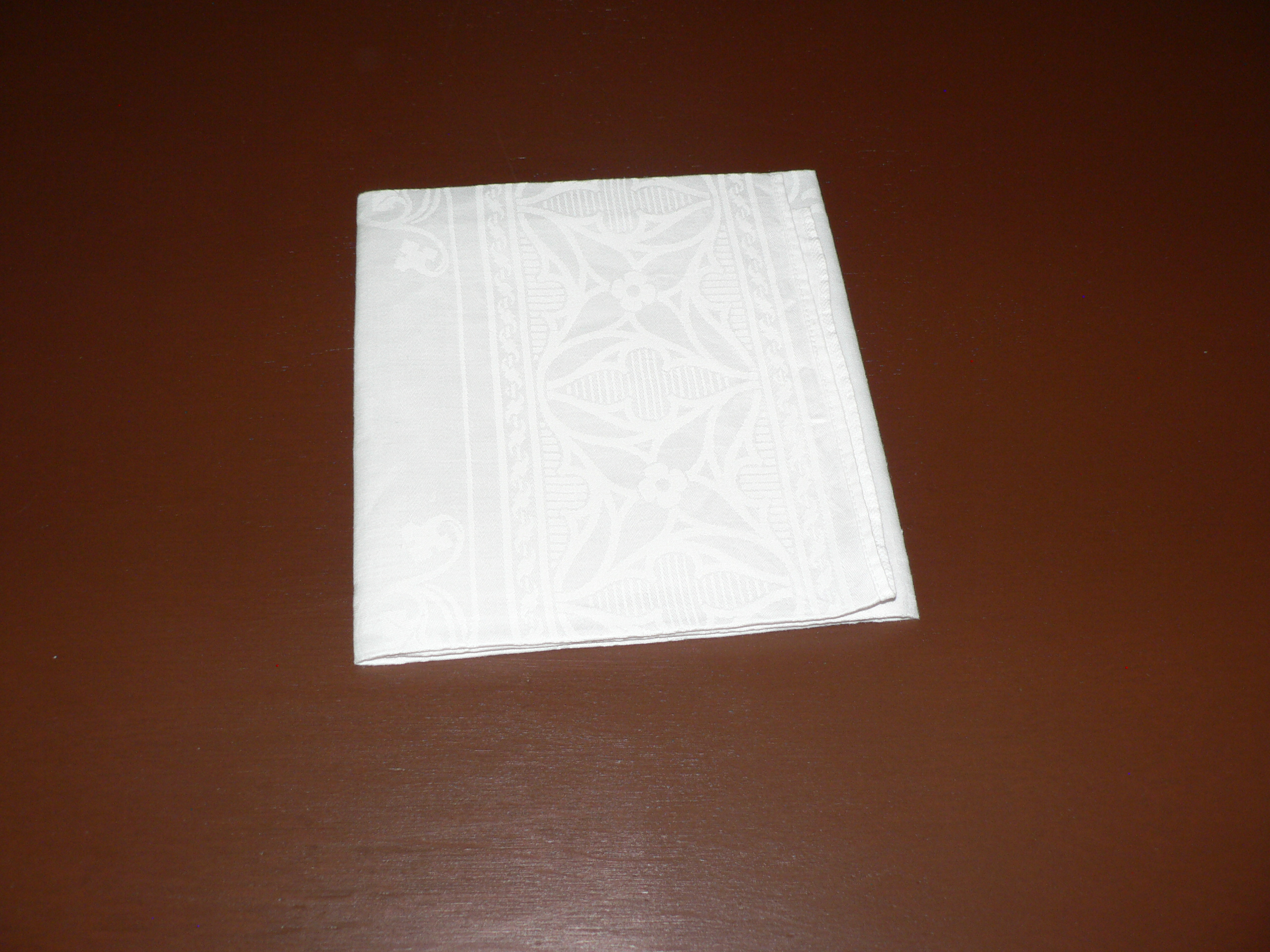
The same corporal, folded.

The corporal is an altar linen used in Christianity for the celebration of the Eucharist. Originally called corporax, from Latin corpus ("body"), it is a small square of white linen cloth; modern corporals are usually somewhat smaller than the width of the altar on which they are used, so that they can be placed flat on top of it when unfolded.

During the Liturgy of the Eucharist, various altar vessels are placed on the corporal, including the chalice, the paten, and the ciborium containing the smaller hosts for the Communion of the laity.

== Origins ==
Early descriptions of altar linens do not clearly distinguish between the corporal and other altar cloths, and the Catholic Encyclopedia speculates that in early Christianity only one linen cloth may have been used. The Liber Pontificalis writes that Pope Sylvester I "decreed that the Sacrifice should not be celebrated upon a silken or dyed cloth, but only on linen, sprung from the earth, as the Body of our Lord Jesus Christ was buried in a clean linen shroud", but the Catholic Encyclopedia is skeptical of the authenticity of this claim. A little later (c. 375), Optatus asks, "What Christian is unaware that in celebrating the Sacred Mysteries the wood [of the altar] is covered with a linen cloth?" Similar references appear in a letter of Isidore of Pelusium, in the liturgical writings of Sophronius of Jerusalem, and the sixth-century "Expositio" of Germanus of Paris,

References to linen altar cloths continue throughout the Middle Ages. By Carolingian times, a clear distinction appears between the corporal and the other altar cloths. In the tenth century, Regino of Prüm quotes a council of Reims as having decreed "that the corporal [corporale] upon which the Holy Sacrifice was offered must be of the finest and purest linen without admixture of any other fibre, because Our Saviour's Body was wrapped not in silk, but in clean linen".

== Corporal and pall ==
The Catholic Encyclopedia speculates that early corporals were likely large enough to double back over the loaves of altar bread, and that they may have become smaller when the practice of the congregation bringing loaves to the altar fell out of use. The corporal continued for some time to be folded back to cover the chalice, to prevent dust or foreign objects from falling into the sacramental wine; this practice is still in use by the Carthusians.

In the eleventh and twelfth centuries, as attested by Anselm of Canterbury, a new practice arose of using a second cloth to cover the mouth of the chalice. This second cloth became called the pall, and Pope Innocent III (1198–1216) writes: "there are two kinds of palls or corporals, as they are called, one which the deacon spreads out upon the altar, the other which he places folded upon the mouth of the chalice."

The Roman Pontifical prescribes a special blessing to be given to both palls and corporals before use, which describes their purpose as "to cover and enfold the Body and Blood of our Lord Jesus Christ". This blessing is mentioned in liturgical documents of the Celtic Rite as early as the seventh century, and the Spanish Liber Ordinum from about the same date gives it in a form very similar to the modern one.

== Form and use ==
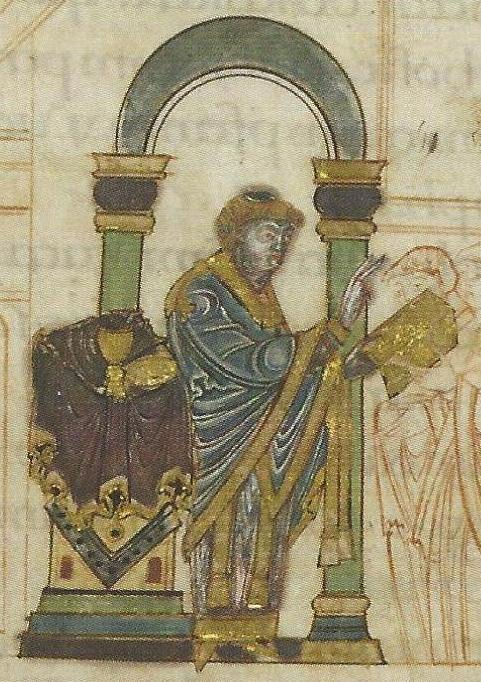
A purple corporal in a medieval manuscript.

According to traditional liturgical rules, the corporal must not be ornamented with embroidery, and must be made entirely of pure white linen, though there seem to have been many medieval exceptions to this rule. The treasury of Monza contains cloths of figured linen which Barbier de Montault described as corporals, although the Catholic Encyclopedia disputes this identification. Gregory of Tours describes silk altar cloths, and John Chrysostom mentions altar cloths made of cloth-of-gold. The writings of Paulus Silentiarius mention purple altar cloths, and a colored miniature in the tenth-century Benedictional of St Æthelwold appears to show one.

Regino of Prüm, writing in the tenth century, laid out rules for the handling of the corporal. He instructed that the corporal was never to remain on the altar, but was to be put in the Missal or shut up with the chalice and paten in some clean receptacle. When the corporal was washed, Regino wrote, it was to be washed first of all by a priest, deacon, or subdeacon in the church itself, in a place or a vessel specially reserved for this, because it had been impregnated with the Body and Blood of Christ. Afterwards it might be sent to the laundry and treated like other linen.

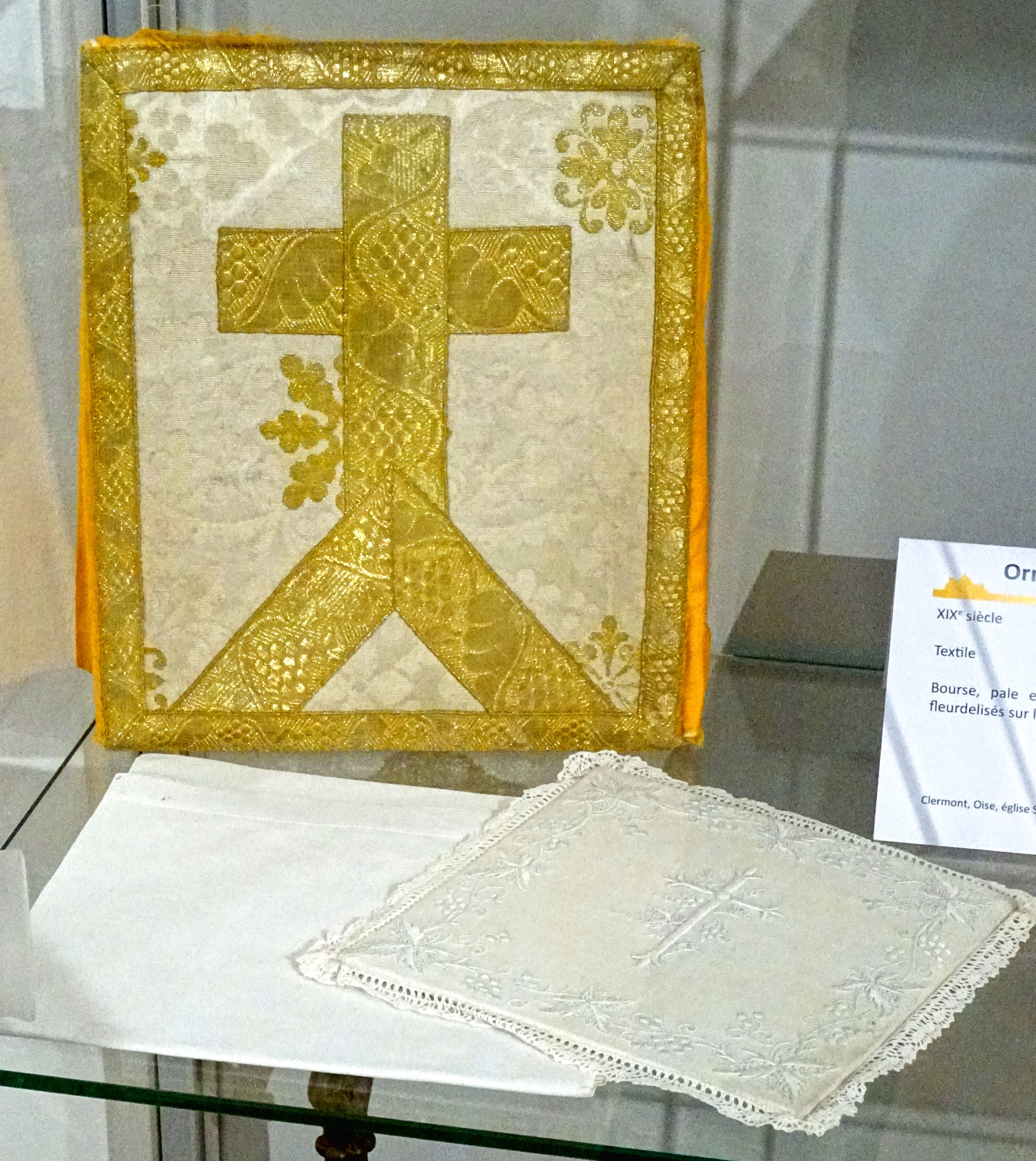
A burse (top), corporal (bottom left), and pall (bottom right).

The 1913 Catholic Encyclopedia describes similar practices to those of the tenth century. It instructs that the corporal, when not in use, is folded twice in each direction, forming a small square. The folded corporal is stored in a small flat case called a burse, which is usually richly ornamented with embroidery. The corporal and pall, it says, must pass through a triple washing at the hands of a priest or subdeacon before being sent to a laundry, and should not be handled by non-clergy, except for sacristans to whom special permission is given.

== See also ==
- Antimension
- Thabilitho
- Chapel of the Corporal at Orvieto Cathedral

== Bibliography ==
- Atchley in St. Paul's Eccles. Soc. Transactions (1900), IV, 156-160
- Barbier de Montault in Bulletin Monumental (1882). 583-630.
- Barbier de Montault, Le Mobilier Ecclésiastique
- Gihr, The Mass, tr. (Freiburg, 1902), 281-264
- Charles Rohault de Fleury, "La Messe" (Paris, 1888), VI, 197-204; Dict. Christ. Antiq., s.v. Corporal;
- Streber in Kirchenlexikon, III, 11O5-11O7
- Thalhofer, Liturgik, I, 777-781
- Van der Stappen, Sacra Liturgia (Mechlin, 1902), III, 102-110
- "Corporal" . Encyclopædia Britannica. Vol. 7 (11th ed.). 1911. p. 189.
