= Antimins =

Altar covering in Eastern Christianity

The antimins (from the Greek Ἀντιμήνσιον, Antimension: "instead of the table"), is a special corporal required to be on the altar in many Eastern Christian liturgical traditions. It was originally used as a portable version of an altar.

It is a rectangular piece of cloth of either linen or silk, typically decorated with representations of the Descent of Christ from the Cross, the Four Evangelists, and inscriptions related to the Passion. A small relic of a martyr is sewn into it. In the Latin Church of the Catholic Church, an altar stone serves a similar function. In the Coptic Church and Syriac Church, it has been replaced by a wooden altar-board or altar-slab.

== Syriac practice ==
A wooden tablet, the ţablîtho, is the liturgical equivalent of the antimins in the churches of Syriac tradition.

== See also ==
- Tabot
- Corporal (liturgy)
- Antependium
- Sthathicon
