= Altar stone =

Part of an altar in a Catholic church

An altar stone is a piece of natural stone containing relics in a cavity and intended to serve as the essential part of an altar for the celebration of Mass in the Catholic Church. Consecration by a bishop of the same rite was required. In the Byzantine Rite, the antimension, blessed and signed by the bishop, serves a similar function.

== History ==
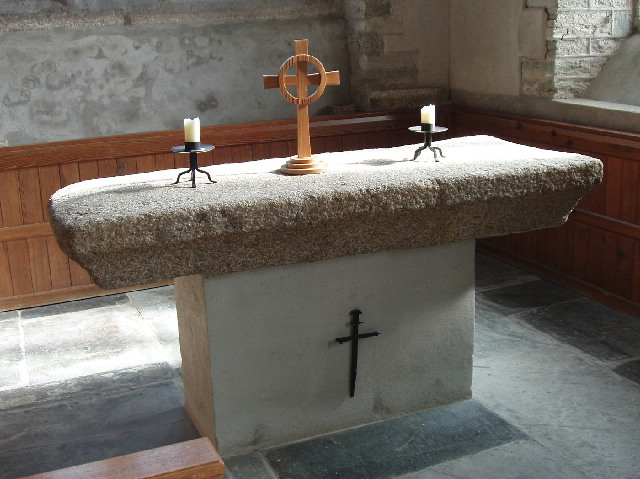
An ancient altar stone at Jacobstow, Cornwall

In contrast to the Jewish practice of building altars of several stones, (Note: For example, Elijah built his altar of twelve stones: "He took twelve stones, for the number of tribes of the sons of Jacob, to whom the LORD had said, 'Your name shall be Israel.' He built an altar in honor of the LORD with the stones, and made a trench around the altar large enough for two seahs of grain" (1 Kings 18:31–33).) the earliest Christian altars were of wood and shaped like ordinary house tables, a practice that continued until the Middle Ages. However, a preference for more durable materials led to church enactments in the West against wooden altars, but not in the East. The earliest stone altars were the tombs of martyrs, over which Mass was sometimes offered, either on a stone slab enclosing the tomb or on a structure placed above it. When the first custom-built Christian basilicas were built, the altar of the church was placed directly above the tomb of a martyr, as in the case of St. Peter's Basilica and the Basilica of Saint Paul Outside the Walls.

== Early 20th-century practice in the Latin Church ==
Before the Second Vatican Council, Latin Church priests could lawfully celebrate Mass only on a properly consecrated altar. This consecration was carried out by a bishop, and involved specially blessed "Gregorian Water" (water to which wine, salt, and ashes are added), anointings and ceremonies.

The First class relics of at least two saints, at least one of which had to be a martyr, were inserted in a cavity in the altar which was then sealed, a practice that was meant to recall the use of martyrs' tombs as places of Eucharistic celebration during the persecutions of the Church in the first through fourth centuries. Also in the cavity were sealed documents relating to the altar's consecration.

The tabletop of the altar, the "mensa", had to be of a single piece of natural stone (almost always marble). Its supports had to be attached to the mensa. If contact was later broken even only momentarily (for instance, if the top was lifted off for some reason), the altar lost its consecration. Every altar had to have a "title" or "titulus" in Latin. This could be The Holy Trinity or one of its Persons; a title or mystery of Christ's life (Christ the Good Shepherd; the Holy Cross); Mary in one of her titles (Mother of Christ; Our Lady of Good Counsel); or a canonized saint.

The main altar of a church had to have the same title as the church itself, for instance, there are many "side altars" in St. Patrick's Cathedral, New York, but the "high altar" in the center is dedicated to St. Patrick. This reflected the idea that the altar was the key element, and the church was built to house it, as opposed to the church being built and simply supplied with an altar as part of its furniture.

Obviously, these regulations would have made it impossible to celebrate Mass anywhere but inside of a Roman Catholic church. To provide for other circumstances—for chaplains of everything from military to Boy Scout units, for priests traveling alone, for missionaries, or for large outdoor celebrations of Mass on pilgrimages—portable altars, popularly called "altar stones," were used.

These were usually blocks of marble, often about 6 inches by 9 inches and an inch thick, consecrated as described above. A priest with a field kit could simply place this stone on any available surface (a tailgate, or a stump or log) to celebrate Mass, or it could be inserted in a flat frame built into the surface of a wooden altar. Many Roman Catholic schools had a full-sized, decoratively carved wooden altar (which, being wood, could not be consecrated) in their gym or auditorium that could be taken out and prepared for Mass, with an altar stone placed in the "mensa" space.

The privilege of using a portable altar was not automatically conferred on any priest. Cardinals and bishops normally had such rights under canon law, but other priests had to be given specific permission—this was, however, easily and widely obtained.

== Present canonical rules for the Latin Church ==
The 1983 Code of Canon Law dedicates a short chapter of five canons to altars for Mass. It states:

It is desirable to have a fixed altar in every church, but a fixed or a movable altar in other places designated for sacred celebrations (Canon 1235 §2)

On the material to be used, it decrees:

Canon 1236 §1. According to the traditional practice of the Church, the table of a fixed altar is to be of stone, and indeed of a single natural stone. Nevertheless, another worthy and solid material can also be used in the judgment of the conference of bishops. The supports or base, however, can be made of any material.
§2. A movable altar can be constructed of any solid material suitable for liturgical use.

With regard to relics of saints, it says:

Canon 1237 §2. The ancient tradition of placing relics of martyrs or other saints under a fixed altar is to be preserved, according to the norms given in the liturgical books.

The norms in The Order of Dedication of a Church and an Altar are:

The tradition of the Roman Liturgy of placing relics of Martyrs or of other Saints under the altar is fittingly to be retained. Nevertheless, the following should be noted:
a) Relics for deposition should be of such a size that they can be recognized as parts of human bodies. Hence, enclosing excessively small relics of one or several Saints is to be avoided.
b) The greatest care must be taken to determine whether relics intended for deposition are authentic. It is better for an altar to be dedicated without relics than to have relics of doubtful authenticity deposited under it.
c) A reliquary must not be placed on the altar or in the table of the altar but under the table of the altar, in a manner suitable to the design of the altar.

The Order of Dedication of a Church and an Altar also states:

[I]t is not permissible to place the relics of Saints in the base of a movable altar.

== See also ==
- Altar Stone (Stonehenge)
- Antimension
- Tabot
- Thabilitho
