= Spiritual practice =

Actions for personal spiritual development

A spiritual practice or spiritual discipline (often including spiritual exercises) is the regular or full-time performance of actions and activities undertaken for the purpose of inducing spiritual experiences and cultivating spiritual development. A common metaphor used in the spiritual traditions of the world's great religions is that of walking a path. Therefore, a spiritual practice moves a person along a path towards a goal. The goal is variously referred to as salvation, liberation or union (with God). A person who walks such a path is sometimes referred to as a wayfarer or a pilgrim.

== Religion ==
=== Abrahamic religions ===
==== Judaism ====
Jewish spiritual practices may include prayer (including the Shema and Amidah), reciting blessings, Jewish meditation, Torah study, following dietary laws of kashrut, observing Shabbat, fasting, practices of teshuvah, giving tzedakah, and performing deeds of loving-kindness. Kavanah is the directing of the heart to achieve higher contemplative thoughts and attain inner strength. Various Jewish movements throughout history have encouraged a range of other spiritual practices. The Musar movement, for example, encourages a variety of meditations, guided contemplations, and chanting exercises. Certain times of year are often associated with certain spiritual practices, including practices of teshuvah during Elul and the High Holy Days, and other practices associated with certain Jewish holidays.

==== Christianity ====
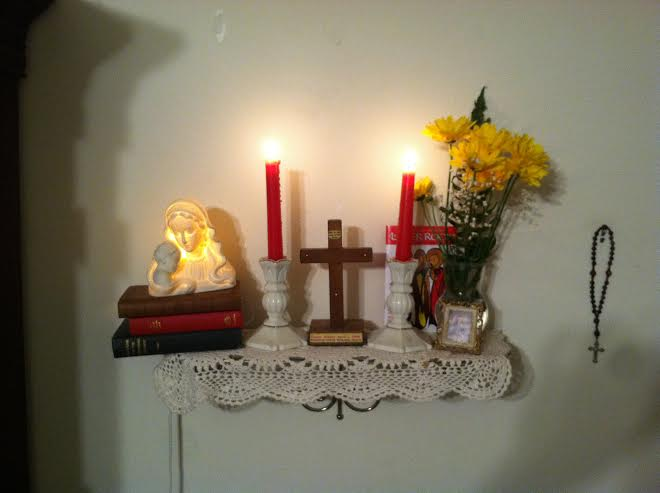
Many devout Christians have a home altar at which they (and their family members) pray and read Christian devotional literature, sometimes while kneeling at prie-dieu.

In Christianity, spiritual disciplines may include: prayer, fasting, reading through the Christian Bible along with a daily devotional, frequent church attendance, constant partaking of the sacraments, such as the Eucharist, careful observance of the Lord's Day (cf. Sunday Sabbatarianism), making a Christian pilgrimage to the Holy Land, visiting and praying at a church, offering daily prayer at one's home altar while kneeling at a prie-dieu, making a spiritual communion, Christian monasticism, Bible study, chanting, the use of prayer beads, mortification of the flesh, Christian meditation or contemplative prayer, almsgiving, blessing oneself at their home stoup daily, observing modest fashion, reconciliation, and Lectio Divina.

Spiritual disciplines can also include any combination of the following: chastity, confession, fasting, fellowship, frugality, giving, guidance, hospitality, humility, intimacy, meditation, prayer, quiet time, reflection, self-control, servanthood, service, simplicity, singing, slowing, solitude, study, submission, surrender, teaching, and worship.

In the Christian liturgical calendar, there are certain spiritual disciplines that are emphasized during various seasons of the Church Year. For example, in the calendar's first liturgical season, Advent, Christians of many denominations prepare for the arrival of Christmastide by praying through a daily devotional, as well as marking an Advent calendar and lighting an Advent wreath. In Lent, the preparatory season for Eastertide, many Christians (especially Catholics, Methodists and Anglicans) participate in the Friday Fast, pray the Stations of the Cross, mark a Lenten calendar, and make a Lenten sacrifice such as giving up alcohol and practicing teetotalism.

Certain Christian denominations emphasize various spiritual disciplines. Praying the rosary, performing corporal and spiritual acts of mercy, and making acts of reparation are spiritual disciplines that are esteemed in the Catholic Church. In Methodism, the works of mercy and works of piety are indispensable spiritual disciplines with respect to one's sanctification. The Religious Society of Friends (also known as the Quakers) practices silent worship, which is punctuated by vocal ministry. Quakers have little to no creed or doctrine, and so their practices constitute a large portion of their group identity.

A well-known writer on Christian spiritual disciplines, Richard Foster, has emphasized that Christian meditation focuses not of the emptying of the mind or self, but rather on the filling up of the mind or self with God.

==== Islam ====
Spiritual practice in Islam is practiced within salat (ritual prayer) during which Muslims subdue all thoughts and concentrate solely on Allah, also through other forms of worship activities like fasting, and Hajj. Among many Muslim groups, immersion in spiritual practices is thought of as more noticeable and deep as practiced by Sufis including Dhikr, Muraqaba, and Sama (Sufi whirling).

==== Baháʼí ====
Prayer in the Baháʼí Faith, refers to two distinct concepts: obligatory prayer and devotional prayer (general prayer). Both types of prayer are composed of reverent words which are addressed to God, and the act of prayer is one of the most important Baháʼí laws for individual discipline.

=== Religions Originating in India ===
==== Buddhism ====
In Theravada Buddhism, the generic term for spiritual cultivation is bhavana. The Pali word "yoga", central to many early Buddhist texts, has been often translated as "Spiritual Practice". In Burmese Buddhist tradition, Awgatha is a formulaic prayer that is recited to initiate acts of Buddhist devotion, including obeisance to the Buddha and Buddhist monks. In Zen Buddhism, meditation (called zazen), the writing of poetry (especially haiku), painting, calligraphy, flower arranging, the Japanese tea ceremony and the maintenance of Zen gardens are considered to be spiritual practices. The Korean tea ceremony is also considered spiritual.

==== Hinduism ====
In Hinduism, the practice of cultivating spirituality is known as sādhanā. Japa, the silent or audible repetition of a mantra and Puja are common Hindu spiritual practices. According to Hindu scriptures, four types of yoga are highly recommended to attain salvation or Moksha-Jnana Yoga, Bhakti Yoga, Karma Yoga and Raja Yoga.

Tantric practices are shared in common between Hinduism and certain Buddhist (especially Tibetan Buddhist) schools, and involve the deliberate use of the mundane (worldly, physical or material) to access the supramundane (spiritual, energetic or mystical) realms.

=== New Age ===
Passage meditation was a practice recommended by Eknath Easwaran which involves the memorization and silent repetition of passages of scripture from the world's religions.

Reiki is a spiritual healing practice that has been popular in New Age spirituality. Reiki is a healing modality that was developed by Japanese lay Buddhist monk Mikao Usui. It spread from Japan to Hawaii and then to the rest of the United States. Reiki involves the laying on of hands or hovering hands over a person's body in order to address spiritual blockages and other related problems. Patients have reported that reiki is effective at reducing pain, stress, anxiety, and depression; in the medical community, skepticism exists toward the effectiveness of reiki.

The term Neotantra refers to a modern collection of practices and schools in the West that integrates the sacred with the sexual, and de-emphasizes the reliance on Gurus.

Recent and evolving spiritual practices in the West have also explored the integration of aboriginal instruments such as the Didgeridoo, extended chanting as in Kirtan, or other breathwork taken outside of the context of Eastern lineages or spiritual beliefs, such as Quantum Light Breath.

== Philosophies ==
=== Cyrenaicism ===
The Cyrenaics developed the spiritual practice of negative visualization, which was later adopted by the Stoics.

=== Epicureanism ===
Epicureanism posits that philosophy is not just a set of beliefs or ethical claims, it is a philosophy of life. Epicurean spiritual practices and exercises include meditating on the Tetrapharmakos, the celebration of Eikas, the practice of aponia, and cultivating the proper understanding of the gods and death so as to remove fear.

=== Stoicism ===
Stoicism takes the view that philosophy is not just a set of beliefs or ethical claims, it is a way of life and discourse involving constant practice and training (e.g., asceticism). Stoic spiritual practices and exercises include contemplation of death and other events that are typically thought negative, training attention to remain in the present moment (similar to some forms of Chinese meditation), daily reflection on everyday problems and possible solutions, keeping a personal journal, and so on. Philosophy for a Stoic is an active process of constant practice and self-reminder.

=== Anthroposophy ===
In the context of his spiritual philosophy Anthroposophy, Rudolf Steiner gave an extensive set of exercises for spiritual development. Some of these were intended for general use, while others were for certain professions, including teachers, doctors, and priests, or were given to private individuals.

== Martial arts ==
Some martial arts, like tai chi, Aikido, and Jujutsu, are considered spiritual practices by some of their practitioners.

== See also ==
- Daoyin
- Jingxiang
- Soul flight
- Spiritual direction
- Spiritual Exercises by Ignatius of Loyola
