= Quiet time =

Christian spiritual activity

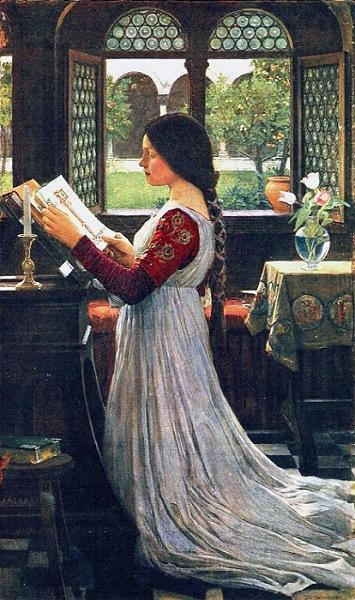
The Missal, by John William Waterhouse (1902), depicts a woman kneeling at a prie-dieu to pray

Quiet time is a regular individual session of Christian spiritual activities, such as prayer, private meditation, contemplation, worship of God, study of the Bible, or reading of a daily devotional. The term "quiet time" or "sacred time" is used by 20th-century Protestants, mostly evangelical Christians. Rick Warren points out that it has also been called "morning watch".

Billy Graham suggested that quiet time consists of three main elements: prayer, Bible reading, and meditation. He also mentioned that many Christians accompany these three elements with journaling. Practices vary according to denominational tradition: Anglican devotions, for example, will occasionally include the use of prayer beads, while Catholics use the term mental prayer and the practice was discussed in the works of John Cassian in the 5th century.

== Background ==
Proponents of the concept point out that Jesus often spent time alone in prayer: Luke 5:16 says that Jesus "would slip away to deserted places and pray" (NRSV). Leslie Hardin suggests that this was Jesus' Quiet Time: spending time in prayer and fellowship with God.

The first mention of the term "quiet time" was in the late nineteenth century. By the 1940s, quiet time had supplanted the Keswick concept of the morning watch as the most widely promoted pattern for private prayer among evangelical Protestants in England and North America. The concept of the morning watch had viewed prayer primarily as petitionary prayer or prayer requests. Quiet time, in contrast, brought Bible study and meditation into the practice and placed the emphasis on listening to God. There was still time for requests, but they now were accompanied by Bible reading, prayers of praise, confession of sin, prayers of thanksgiving, and listening to God. Quiet time was therefore quieter, hence the name.

First developed in Christian and Missionary Alliance circles, quiet time (also called the "quiet hour") was promoted by modernist Protestants like Harry Fosdick, as well as by the Oxford Group and Samuel Shoemaker, an instrumental figure in the founding of Alcoholics Anonymous. But the real rise of the quiet time began with InterVarsity Christian Fellowship's 1945 publication of the booklet Quiet Time. Popularized by InterVarsity among evangelical university students, other neo-evangelical campus ministries also adopted the practice, including The Navigators and Campus Crusade for Christ. Adopted by Billy Graham in the 1950s, quiet time became the most popularized evangelical Protestant devotional practice from the middle of the twentieth century to the present.

== Use ==
Jerry and Becky Evans argue that the quiet time is a time of encouragement, strengthening, and insight to the Christian, and "spiritual food" for a person's soul. They suggest that it is a "time of complete focus on God" that "continues throughout a person’s entire life."

Keith Newman suggests that as well as including conscious study and expressive prayer, a quiet time is a time of open-minded listening and waiting for guidance.

Rick Warren argues that there is a difference between reading the Bible during quiet time and Bible study.

== Materials ==
Many devotional books, or "devotionals", are available in shops today. These books contain directed Bible studies, often incorporating stories or anecdotes that convey Biblical principles, similar to the parables used by Jesus in his ministry. A notable example is My Utmost for His Highest, written by Oswald Chambers. Many Christian stores dedicate an entire section to these types of books, but in some countries they are available at secular stores as well, often shelved in the "inspirational" section.

Some Christian communities (e.g., Christadelphians) have Bible reading schedules, like the one suggested in the Bible Companion, for example, as one tool to help them with their study of the Bible. Such schedules take people systematically through the entire Bible, reading approximately four chapters per day (in the case of the Bible Companion), which allows the reader to keep context in their studies through the different books of the Bible, and ensures different areas are not neglected.

Robert Murray M'Cheyne also designed a system for reading through the Bible in one year. The plan entails reading the New Testament and the Psalms through twice a year, and the Old Testament through once. This program was included (in a slightly modified form) in For the Love of God by D. A. Carson (ISBN 0851115896) and is recommended by several Bible publishers, such as the English Standard Version and the New English Translation. More recently, two similar one-year Bible-reading devotionals by Eliot Young, The Word at Work (ISBN 978-1500332358) and The Spirit at Work (ISBN 978-1496034830), suggest three psalms per day, thus providing for a minimum of seven psalm-cycles per year.

The church of England Common Worship Lectionary provides a pattern for daily devotional readings.

The use of study Bibles is also popular.

== Criticism ==
Evangelical theologian Greg Johnson criticizes the way the concept is sometimes treated by evangelicals as a law instead of a means of grace. While advocating a life of prayer and biblical contemplation, his concern is that personal devotions not become a performance treadmill in which Christians feel their daily acceptance with God is based on what they do instead of what Christ did. He emphasizes that the practice of the quiet time is not commanded in the Bible, and was not even possible for many centuries, until the printing press and certain economic conditions enabled most Christians to own their own copies of the Bible.

== See also ==
- Catholic devotions
- Family worship
- Hesychia
- Lectio Divina
- Mystic prayer
- Spiritual discipline
