= The Philosophical Library =

The Philosophical Library (Philosophical and Religious Free Library) is a non-profit organization run entirely by volunteers and founded in 1963. It administers extensive lending privileges in a wide array of books in the fields of philosophy, religion, metaphysics and spiritual practices. It presents itself as a "place of fellowship and spiritual growth as well as a research and study center." The Philosophical Library's mission statement: "Our mission at The Philosophical Library is to create a Conscious Community by providing unique resources for those seeking meaning through diverse paths of Wisdom."
