= Family Bible (book) =

Bible handed down through a Christian family

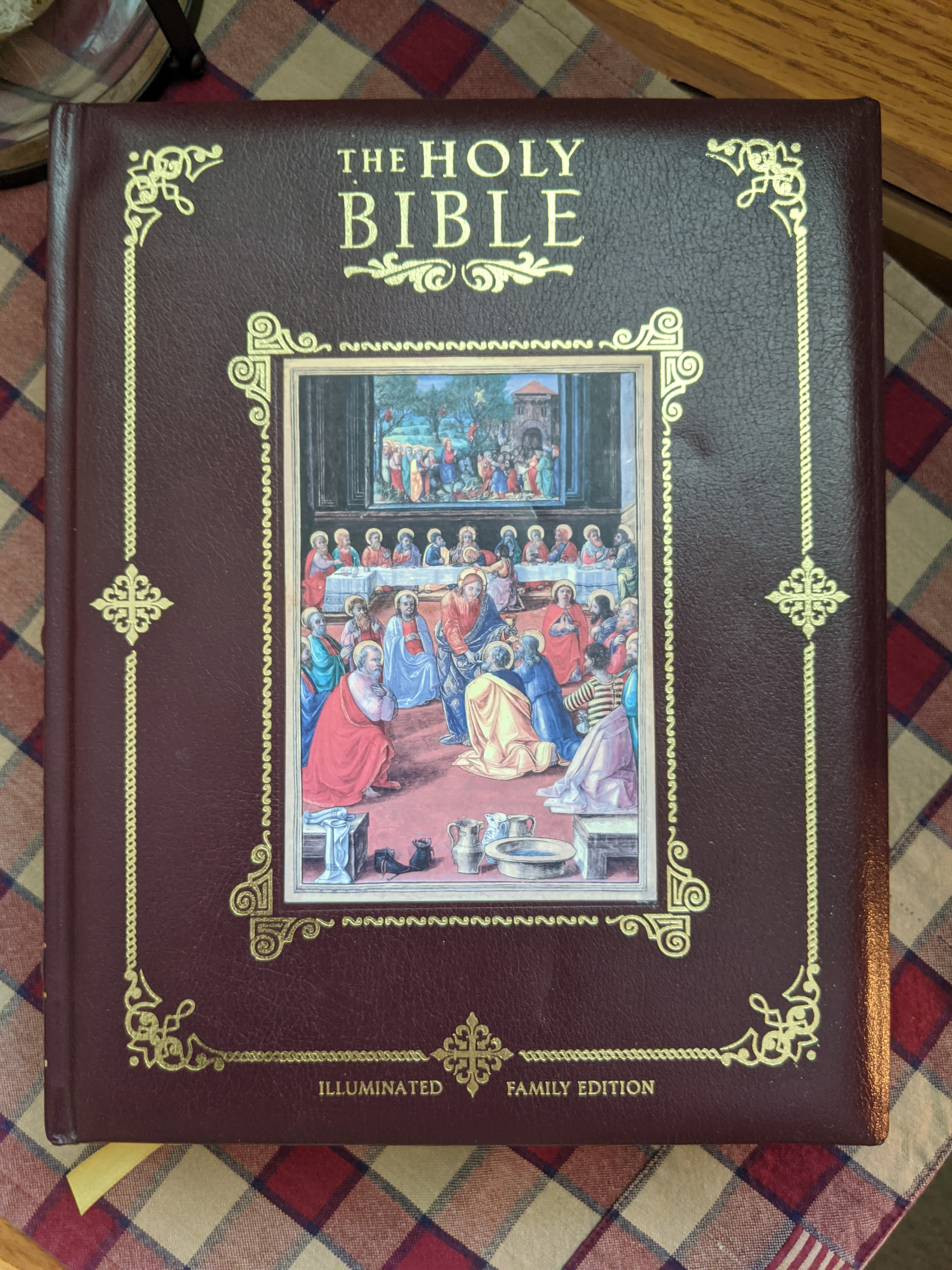
An illustrated cover of a family Bible

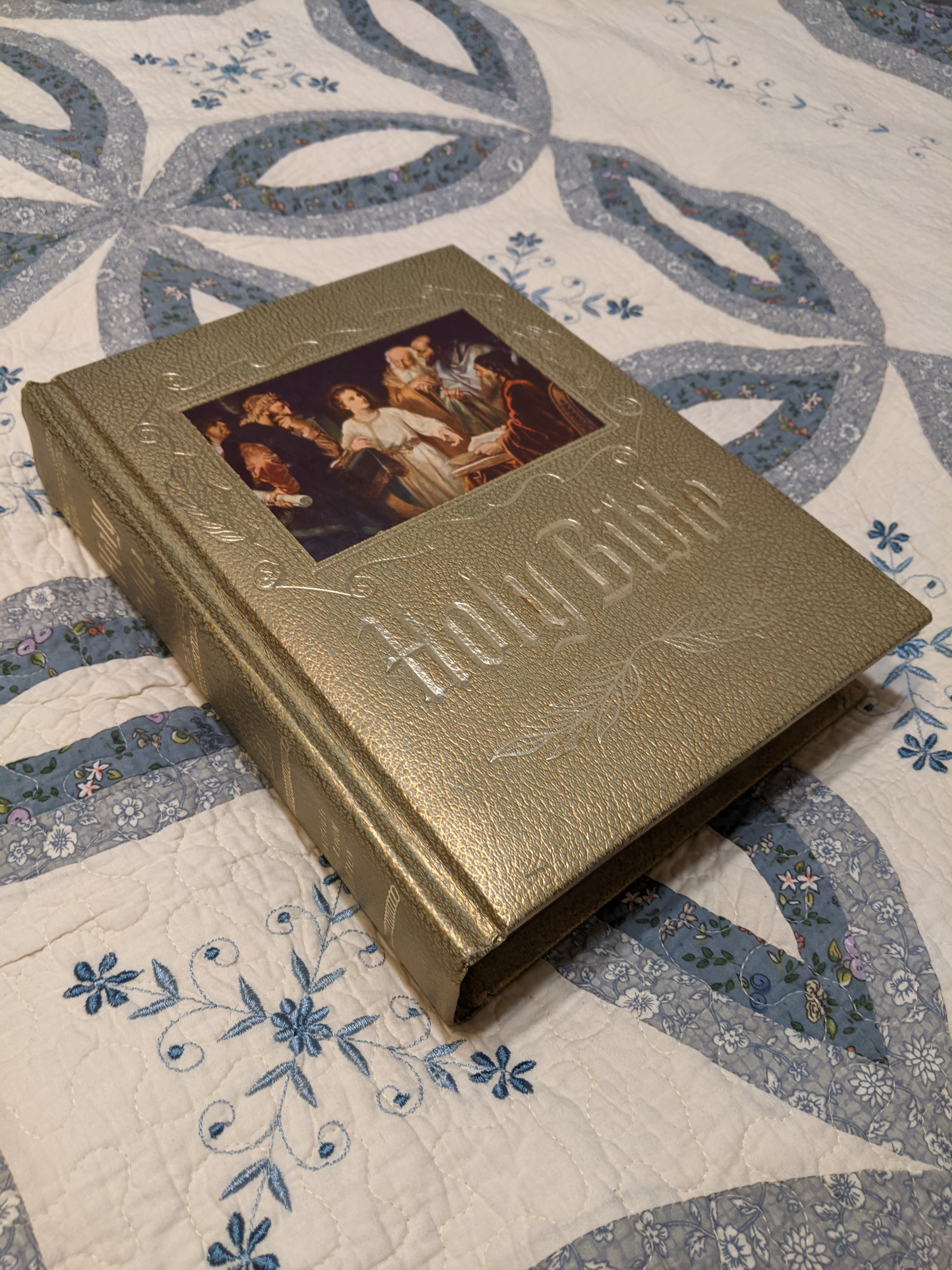
A family Bible

A family Bible is a Bible handed down through a Christian family, with each successive generation recording information about the family's history inside it. Typically, this information consists of births, deaths, baptisms, confirmations and marriages; family Bibles contain a "family record" or "family registry" section to record this information. People sometimes may place other items, such as holy cards, certificates, letters, newspaper cuttings and photographs, inside a family Bible. In the United Kingdom, they are found today and were especially common in the Victorian period, and are also found in the United States, Canada, Australia and New Zealand. Family Bibles are often placed on a family's home altar, being regularly used for family prayer. They are often used as sources for genealogical research.

== Gallery ==
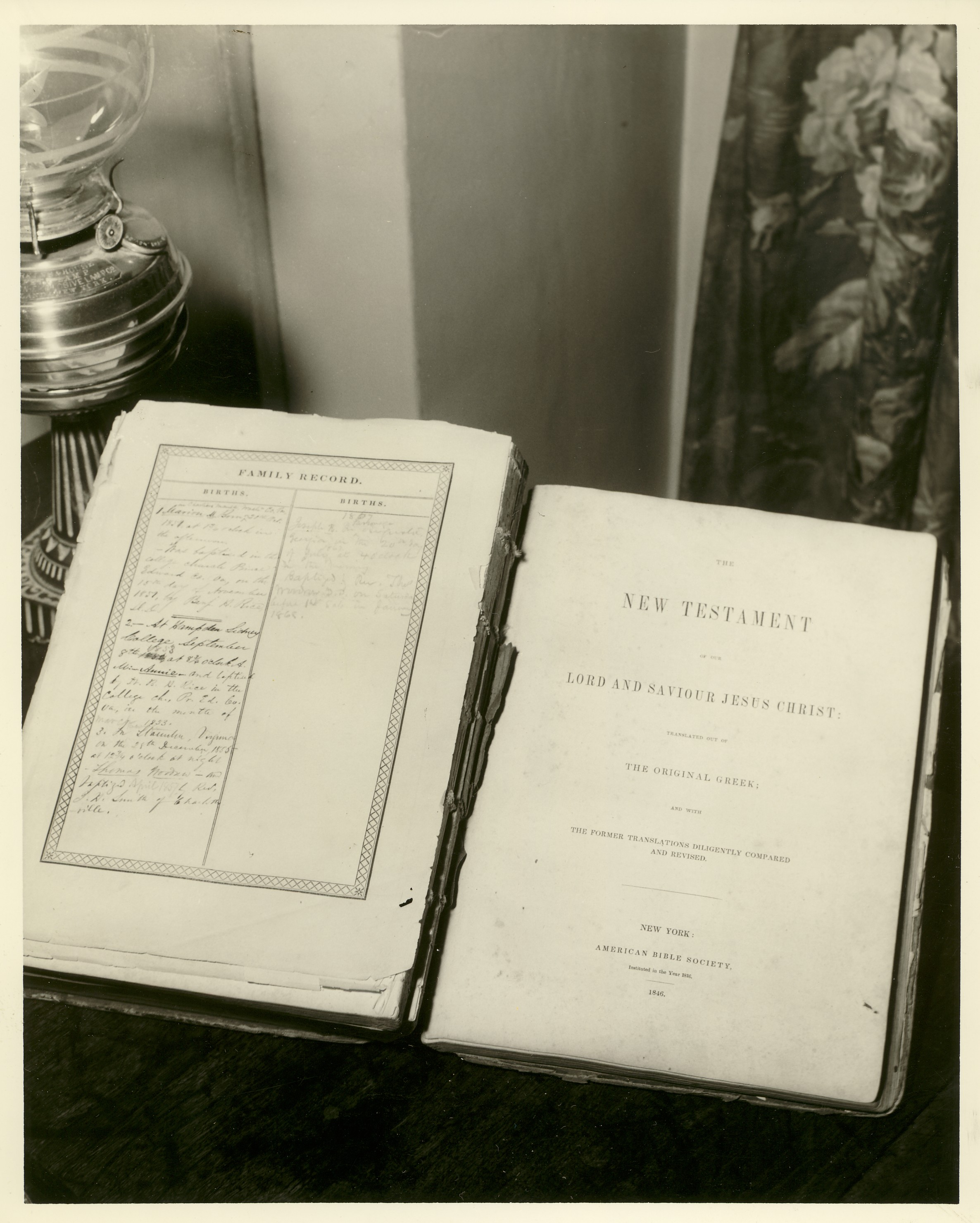
Family bible of Woodrow Wilson

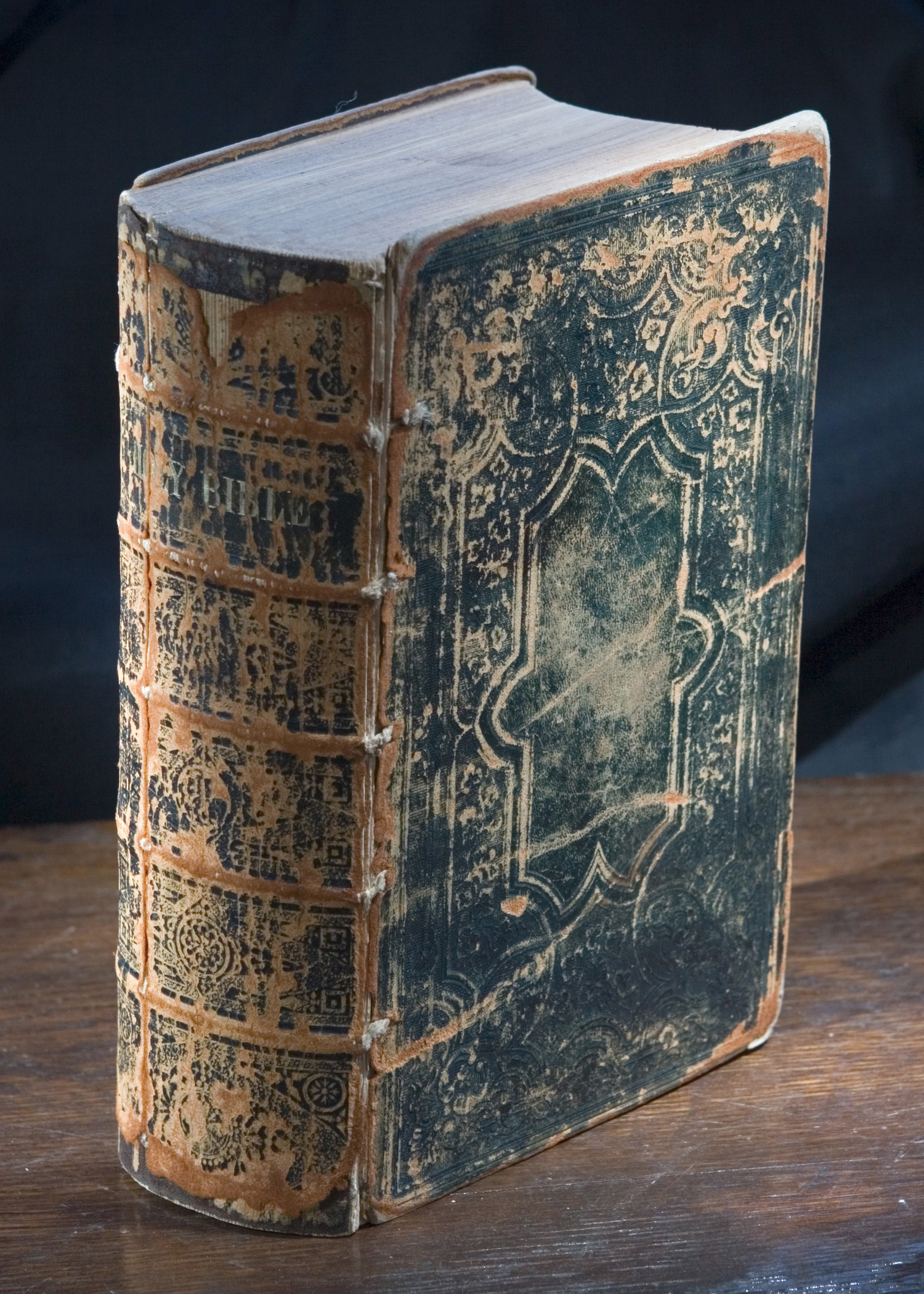
A family Bible

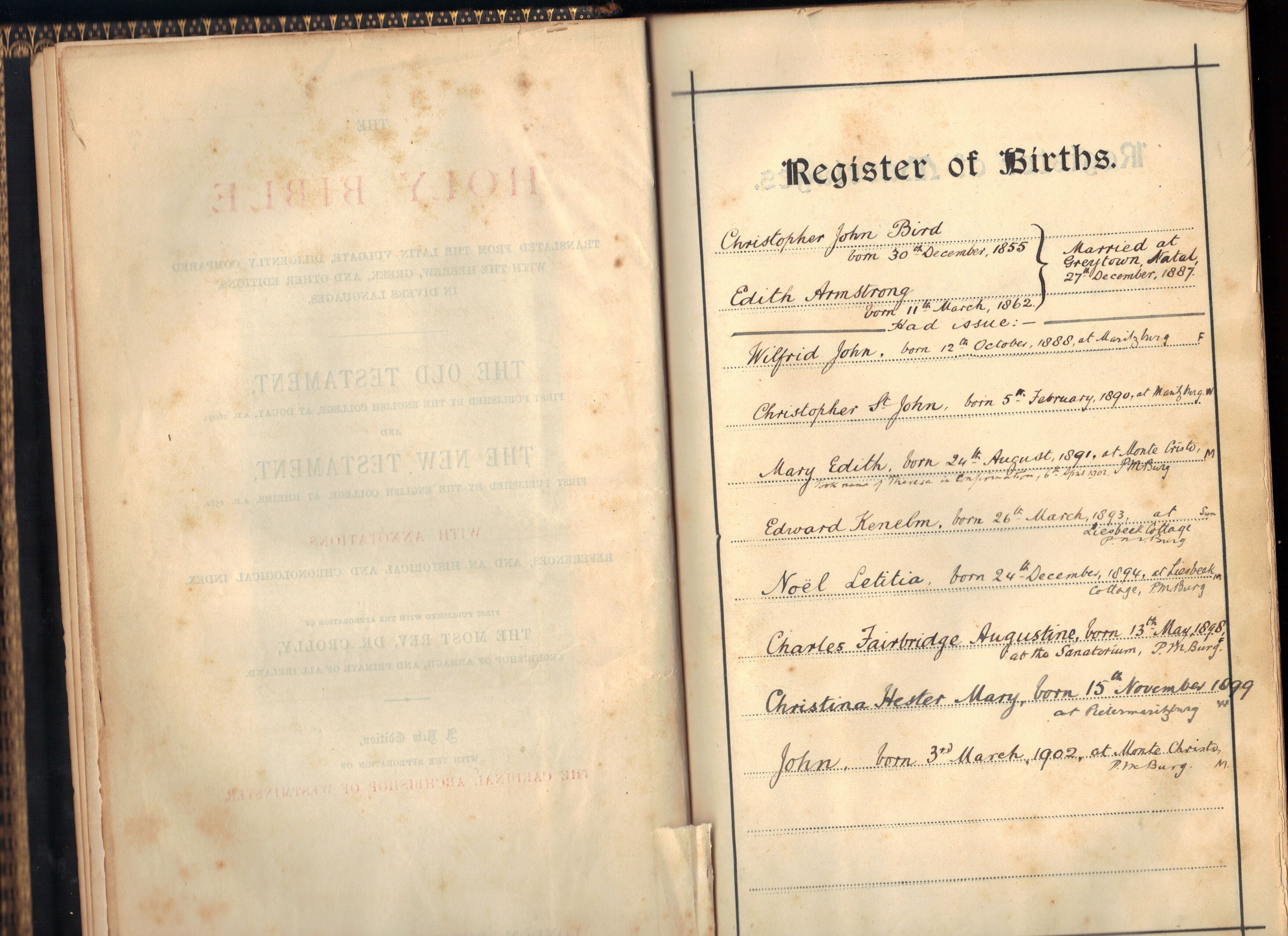
Birth record

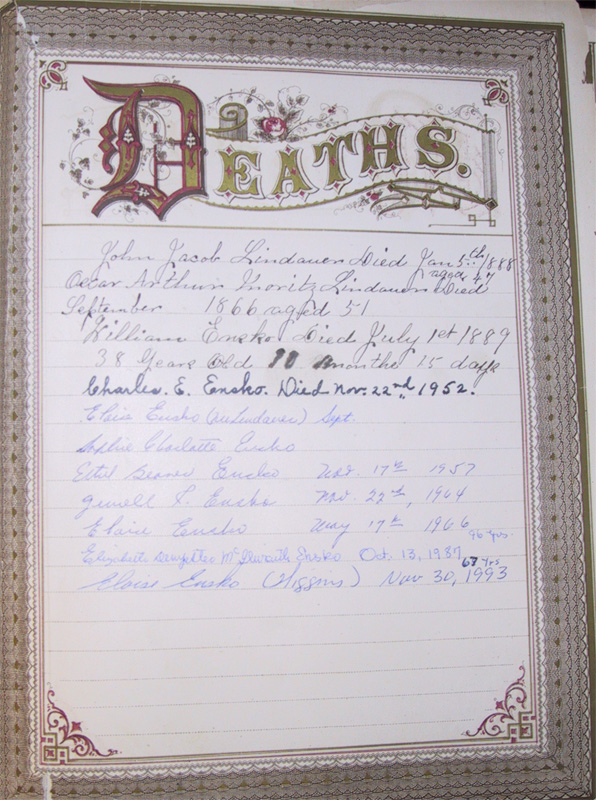
Death record

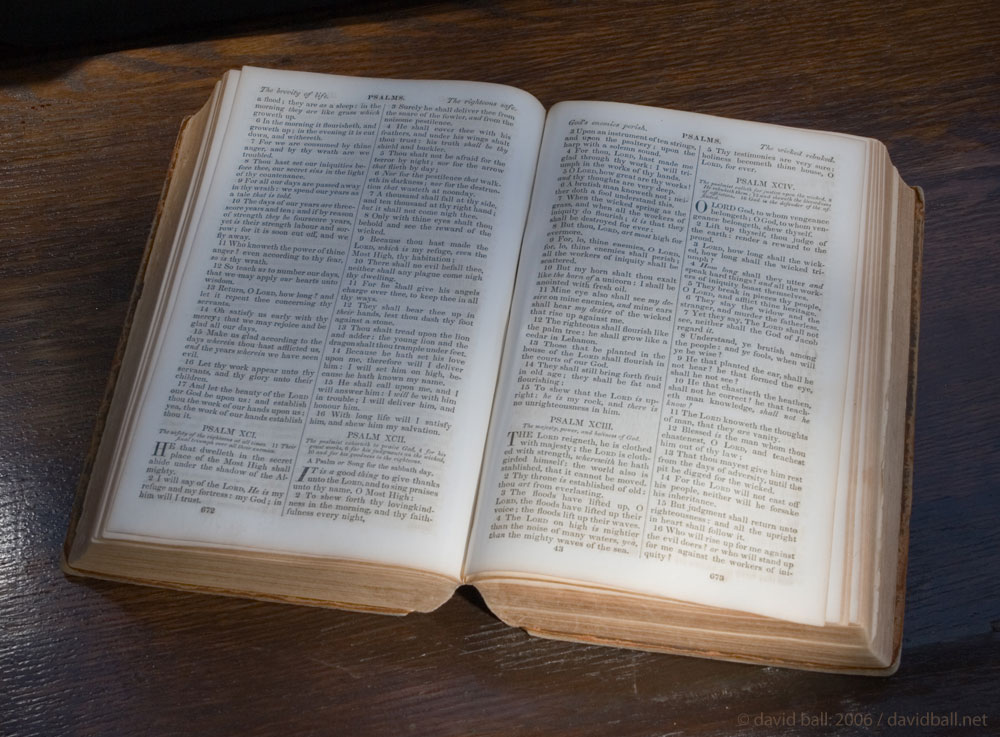
Family Bible open to the book of Psalms

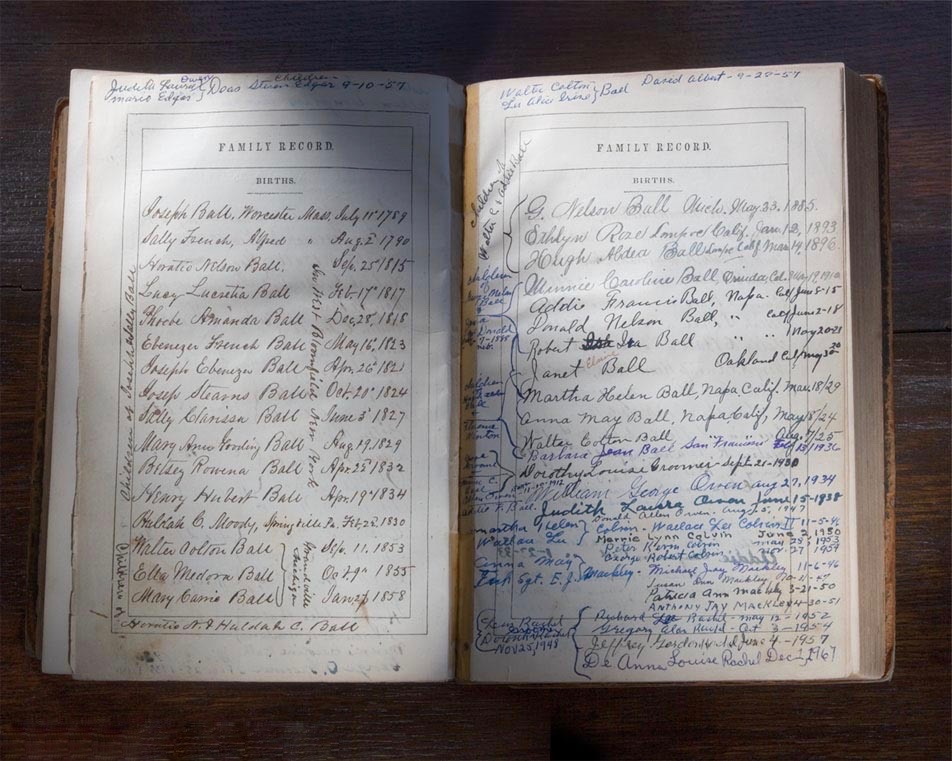
Family Bible, showing birth records
