= Morobi Refugee Settlement =

Refugee camp in Northern Uganda

Morobi Refugee Settlement is a refugee settlement located in Palorinya Parish of Moyo District, Northern Uganda. The camp is home to over 34,405 refugees.

== Social services ==
Bible Study Groups have been formed in Morobi.

=== Governance ===
In the Morobi refugee camp, hundreds of thousands of people were given 30x30 plots of land on which they built houses and cultivated crops.
