= Holy water font =

Vessel containing holy water in a church

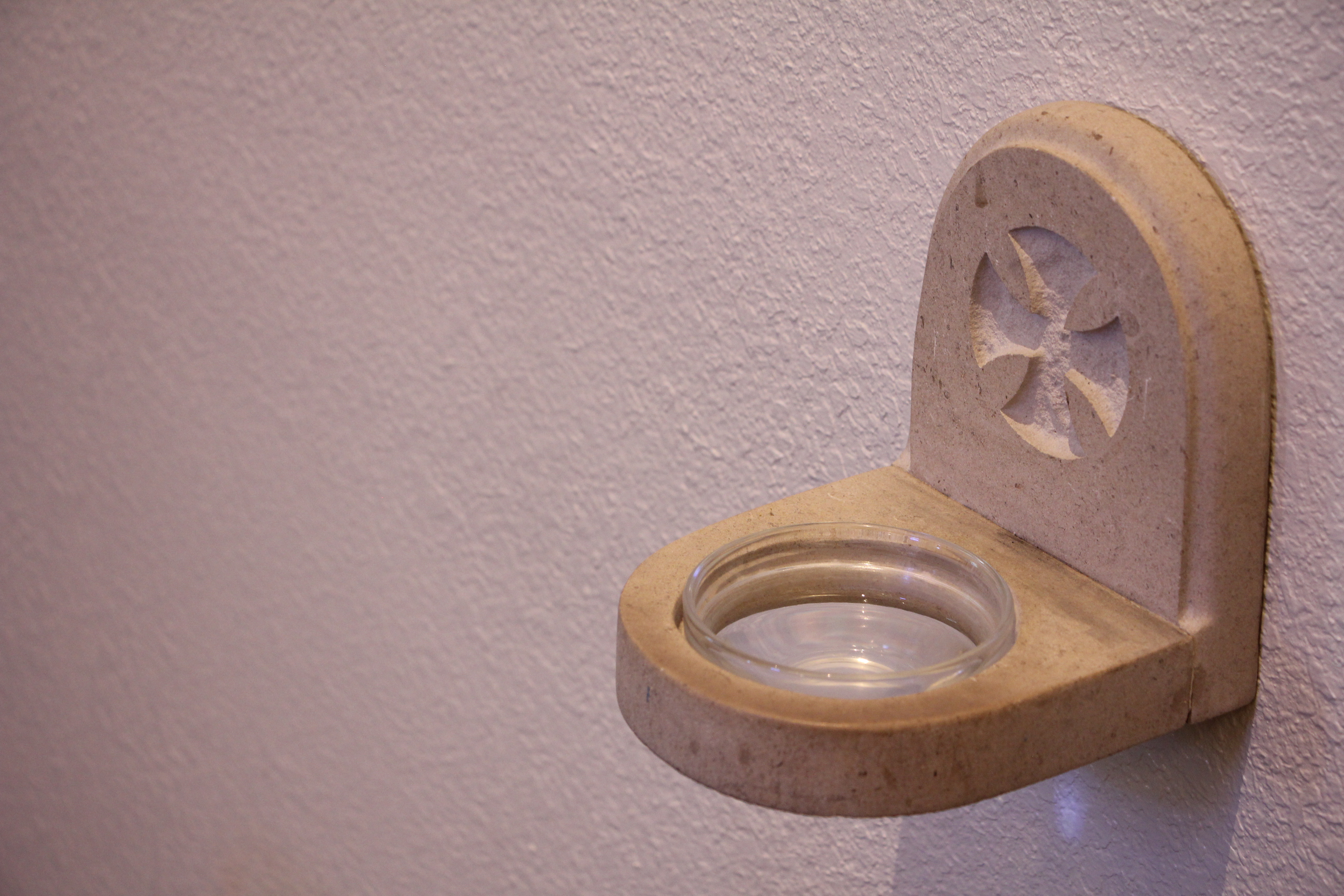
Holy water font at the entrance of the Cathedral Church of Our Lady of Walsingham in Houston, Texas

A holy water font or stoup is a vessel containing holy water which is generally placed near the entrance of a church. It is often placed at the base of a crucifix or other Christian art. It is used in Catholic, as well as many Lutheran and Anglican churches, to make the sign of the cross using the holy water upon entrance of the church. Holy water is blessed by a priest or a deacon, and its usage by Christians serves as a reminder of their baptismal vows. The holy water font is a derivative of the cantharus, which has been used by Christians since the time of the early Church to perform ablutions before entering the church (while these are no longer normative in Western Christianity, canthari are found at the entrance of certain Oriental Orthodox and Eastern Orthodox churches).

== Gallery ==
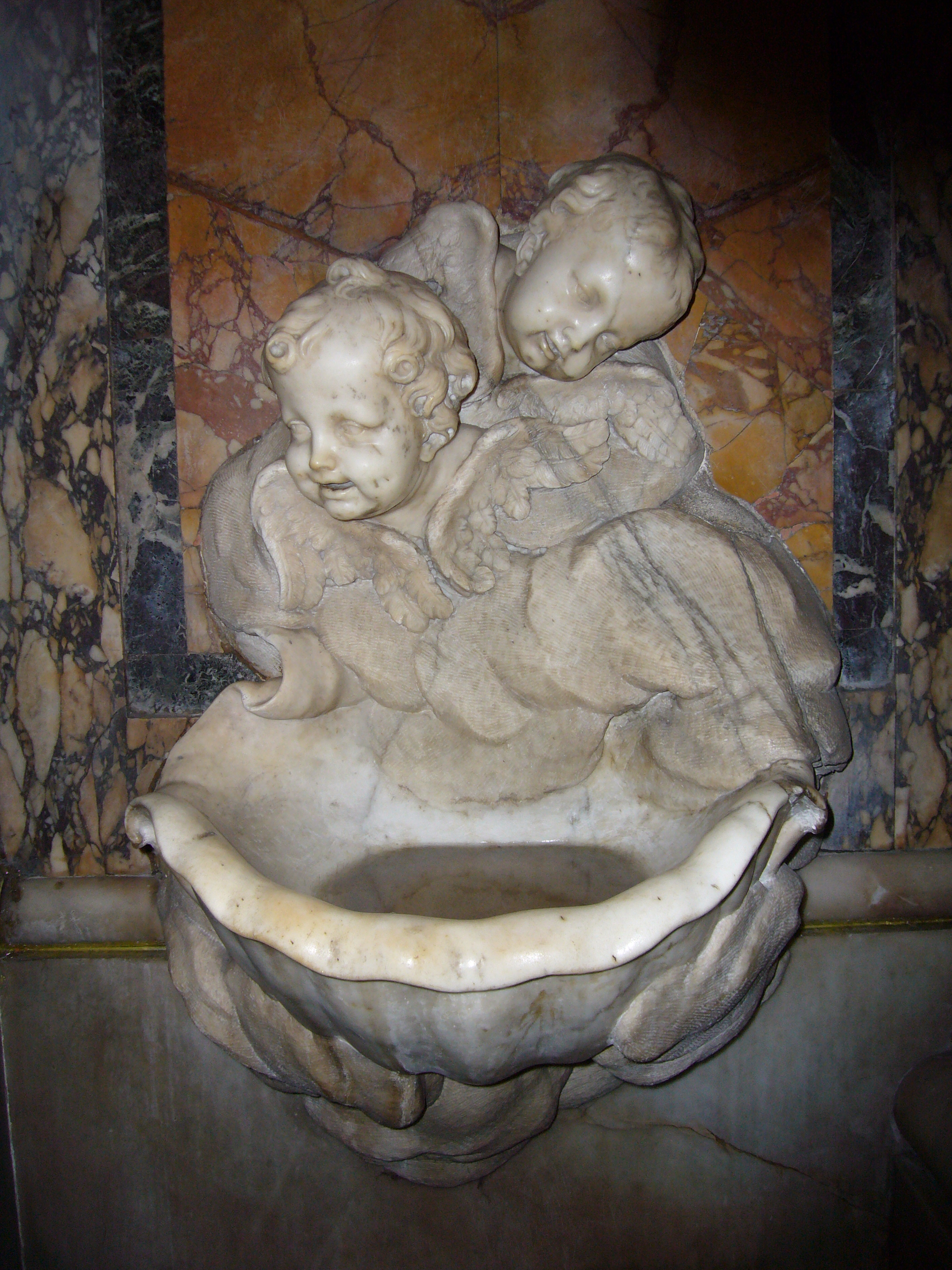
Holy water font in Santa Maria Maddalena, Rome, Italy

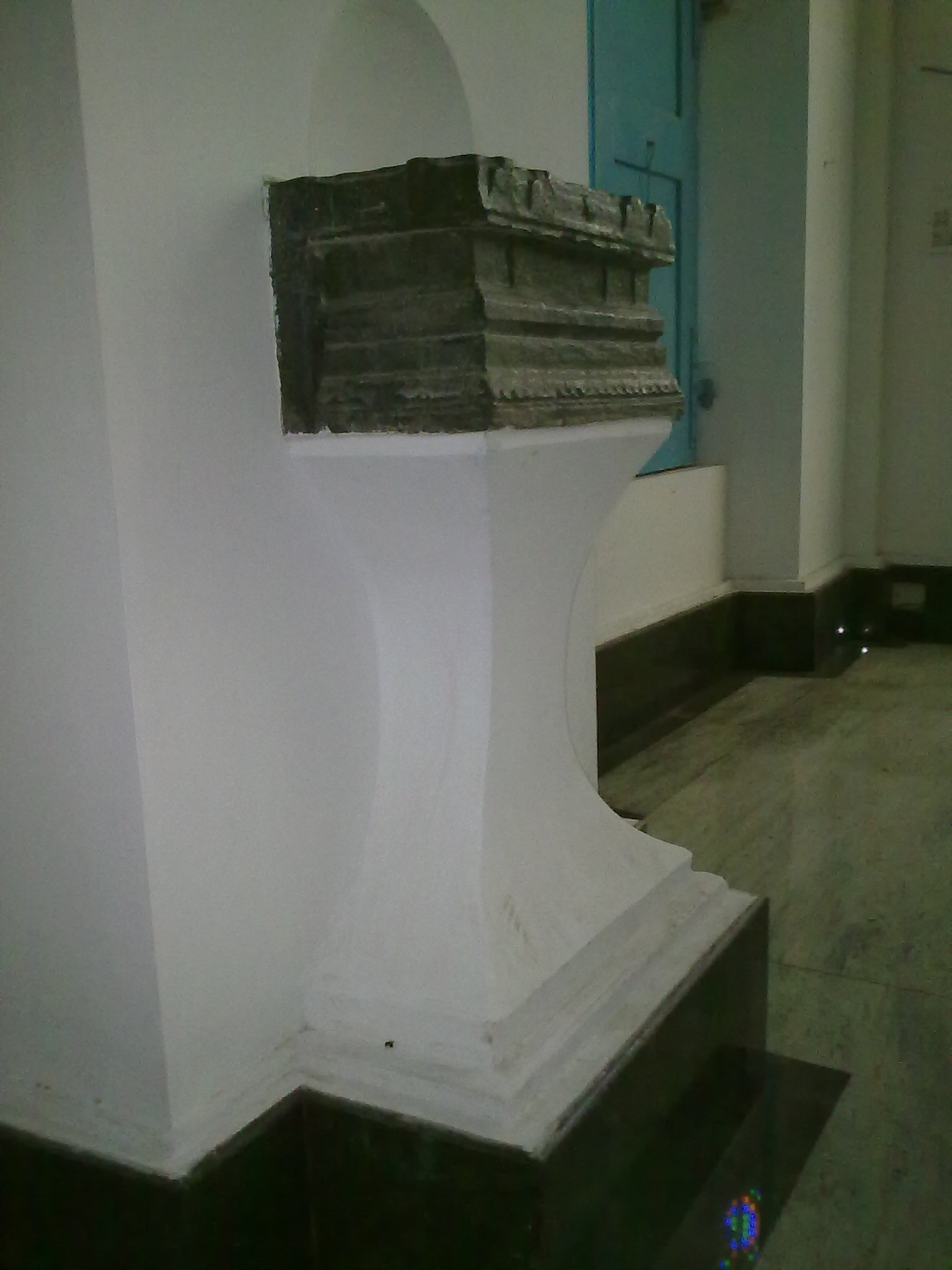
A carved stoup at the Immaculate Conception Cathedral, Pondicherry, India

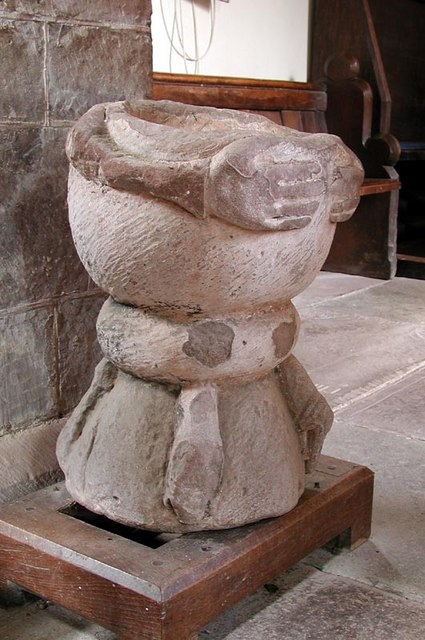
Carved stoup at the entrance of the Church of St Mary and St David, Kilpeck, England

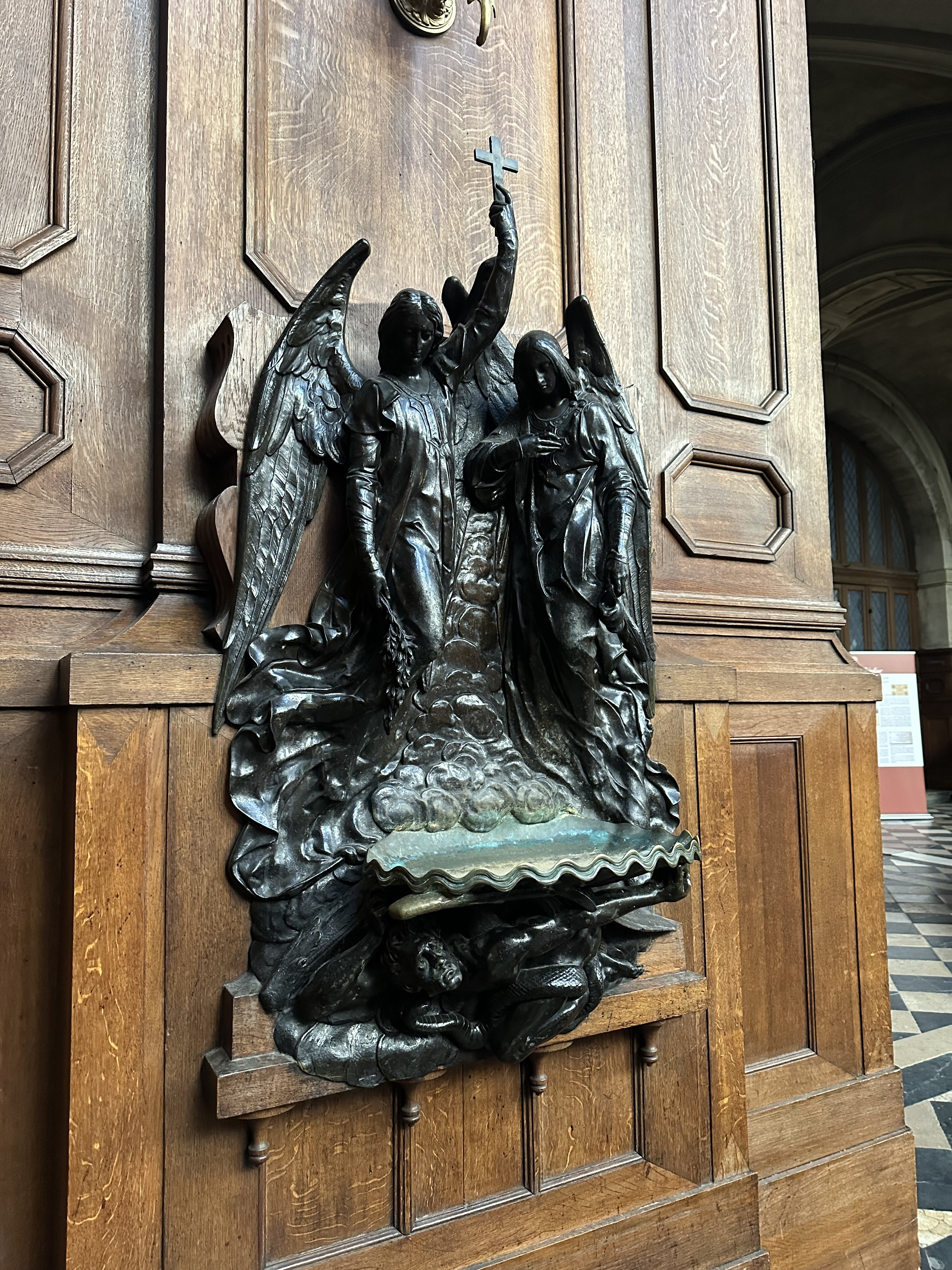
Holy water font at Saint Elizabeth of Hungary Church, Paris, France

== See also ==
- Baptismal font
- Home stoup
- Nipson anomēmata mē monan opsin
