= Bible study (Christianity) =

Study of the Bible

In Christian communities, Bible study is the study of the Bible by people as a personal religious or spiritual practice. In many Christian traditions, Bible study, coupled with prayer, is known as doing devotions or devotional acts. Many Christian churches schedule time to engage in Bible study collectively. The origin of Bible study groups has its origin in early Christianity, when Church Fathers such as Origen and Jerome taught the Bible extensively to disciple Christians. In Christianity, Bible study has the purpose of "be[ing] taught and nourished by the Word of God" and "being formed and animated by the inspirational power conveyed by Scripture".

== Personal Bible study ==
In Evangelical Protestantism, the time set aside to engage in personal Bible study and prayer is sometimes informally called a Quiet Time. In other traditions personal Bible study is referred to as "devotions". Catholic devotions, Lutheran devotions and Anglican devotions, among other Christian traditions, may employ the Lectio Divina method of Bible reading.

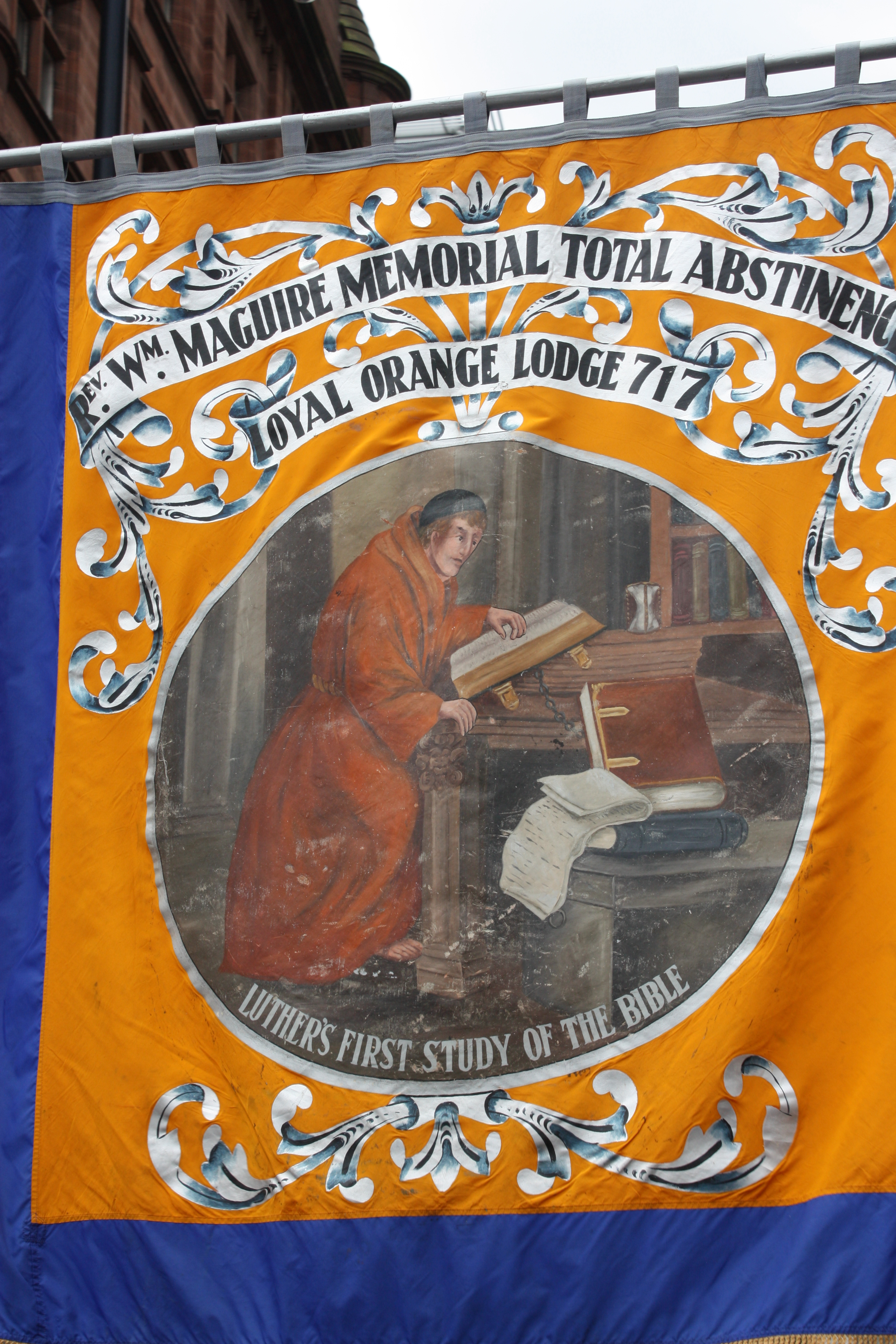
Martin Luther studying the Bible on the banner of the Grand Orange Lodge of Ireland.

Christians of all denominations may use study Bibles and Bible reading notes to assist them in their personal Bible studies. In some cases, the practice of reading through the entire Bible in a year is followed, this usually requires readings each day from both the Old and New Testament. This practice, however, has been widely criticized on the basis that the understanding gained of each specific passage is too vague.

The association of Bible study and prayer is an important one. Christians do not merely study the Bible as an academic discipline, but with the desire to know God better. Therefore, they frequently pray that God will give them understanding of the passage being studied. They also consider it necessary to consider what they read with an attitude of respect, rather than the critical attitude which is frequently followed in formal study. To them, the Bible is not just a sacred book, but is the very Word of God, that is, a message from God which has direct relevance to their daily lives.

=== Inductive Bible study ===
Inductive Bible study is a means of studying and exegeting a biblical passage. Richard Krejcir describes it in terms of "interviewing a passage" without preconceptions or agendas. Inductive Bible study involves examining the ideas and words of the text, which leads to the meanings and then the interpretations, which in turn lead the reader to conclusions and applications. In inductive study, the reader will read a passage and then ask questions of how they personally interpret the verse(s). These questions can range from what the verse(s) literally means to how it applies to the believer's present personal circumstances. The purpose of these questions is to go deep enough into the text to extract the meaning and then to apply that gained knowledge to their personal life in order to create change for their own or other people's benefit.

=== Exegetical Bible study ===
In this type of study, the believer also goes beyond the surface value of the text. However, the purpose is not so much for personal application as gaining information. Exegetical study is used most often by pastors, theologians, writers, professors, and church leaders in order to prepare for sharing lessons with others. It is often categorized as advanced Bible study and is meant to extract the ideas found in the text for the primary purpose of teaching.

== Bible study in small groups ==
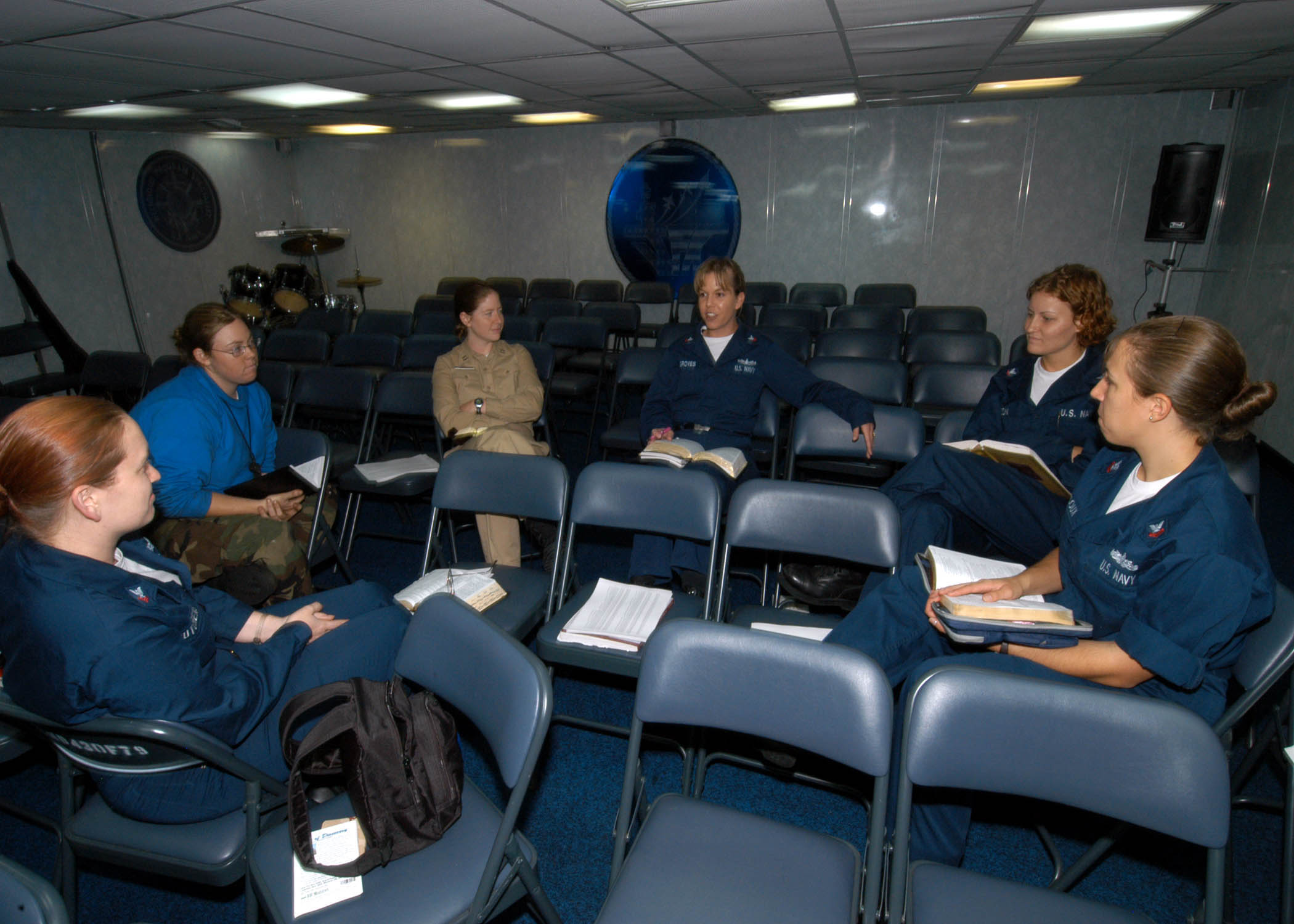
Bible study in the chapel of the USS John F. Kennedy (CV-67).

Bible study groups within congregations are sometimes known as cell groups, though many different names exist. The Bible is often studied in informal small groups, and groups within parachurch organizations. During these study times, groups will set their main topic to be biblical studies. Though there may exist some form of worship and prayer, the purpose of Bible study is to collectively grasp an understanding of God through His Word. These groups become small communities often sharing this personal journey to discovering the meaning of the passage.

Some Churches encourage the formation of small groups while others form casually or due to shared interest or common circumstances (such as a singles small group or a newly wed couple group). These groups range from young children, normally middle school and up led by an adult, to elderly people. These groups can even interact with other small groups. Groups may be formed based on age group (e.g. youth, young adults, etc.) or by other demographic markers (singles, married couples, gender-specific).

== Distinctives by Christian denomination ==
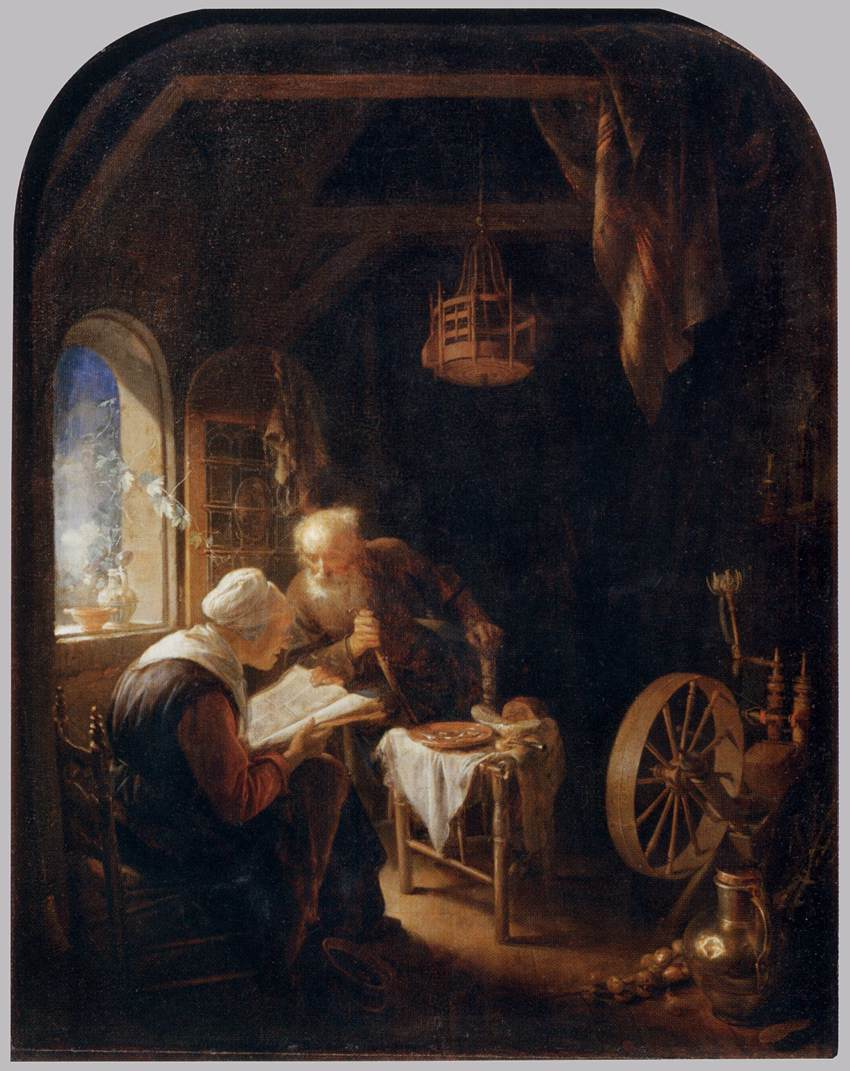
Reading the Bible by Gerrit Dou

=== Baptists ===
With the sola scriptura approach to Sacred Scripture held by Christians of the Baptist tradition, Bible study is viewed as a key practice in furthering one's relationship with God.

=== Catholicism ===
Providentissimus Deus, "On the Study of Holy Scripture", is an encyclical letter issued by Pope Leo XIII on 18 November 1893. In it, he reviewed the history of Bible study from the time of the Church Fathers to the present, spoke against the errors of the Rationalists and "higher critics", and outlined principles of scripture study and guidelines for how scripture was to be taught in seminaries. He also addressed the issues of apparent contradictions between the Bible and physical science, or between one part of scripture and another, and how such apparent contradictions can be resolved.

Divino afflante Spiritu, ("Inspired by the Holy Spirit"), is an encyclical letter issued by Pope Pius XII on 30 September 1943 calling for new translations of the Bible from the original languages, instead of the Latin Vulgate of Jerome, which was revised multiple times and had formed the textual basis for all Catholic vernacular translations until then. It inaugurated the modern period of Roman Catholic biblical studies by encouraging the study of textual criticism (or lower criticism), pertaining to text of the Scriptures themselves and transmission thereof (for example, to determine correct readings) and permitted the use of the historical-critical method (or higher criticism), to be informed by theology, Sacred Tradition, and ecclesiastical history on the historical circumstances of the text.

The general theme of the "Word of God" was covered by the Second Vatican Council in November 1965 in its Dogmatic Constitution on Divine Revelation: Dei Verbum. Dennis Hamm notes an intention on the part of the Bishops at the Council to counter the situation where "it was almost a mark of the Catholic Church that [it was] not a Bible-reading or Bible-quoting denomination". Henceforth, "like the Christian religion itself, all the preaching of the Church must be nourished and regulated by Sacred Scripture".

The 1992 Catechism of the Catholic Church describes principles of Bible Study in paragraphs 101–141 and other sections. For Catholics, the Word of God is not a "dead letter" but is incarnate and living. Christ must through the Holy Spirit open minds to understand the Scriptures.

Verbum Domini (English: The Word of the Lord) is a post-synodal apostolic exhortation issued by Pope Benedict XVI which deals with how the Catholic church should approach the Bible. He issued it following the XII Ordinary General Assembly of the Synod of Bishops, which had met in October 2008 to discuss "The Word of God in the Life and Mission of the Church". Verbum Domini is dated September 30, 2010, for the Feast of St. Jerome, the patron saint of Biblical studies.

=== Eastern Orthodoxy ===
The Eastern Orthodox Churches teach that "Reading Scripture is important. If prayer is where we speak to God, Scripture is the best way to listen to Him."

=== Lutheranism ===
In Lutheran Christianity, Bible study is often done in "small groups, large groups, [and in] personal devotions". The Lectio Divina method of studying Scripture may be employed by Lutherans.

=== Methodism ===
The theology of prima scriptura forms the basis for the establishment of doctrine in the Methodist tradition. The United Methodist Church teaches that "the Holy Spirit works today in our thoughtful study of the Scriptures, especially as we study them together, seeking to relate the old words to life's present realities".

== See also ==
- Catechesis
- Eisegesis
- Exegesis
- Hermeneutics
- Sunday school
