= Lenten calendar =

Christian calendar used during Lent

A Lenten calendar or Lent calendar is a special calendar used by Western Christians to count the days of Lent in anticipation of Easter. Lenten calendars traditionally start on Ash Wednesday and conclude on Easter Day. As with an Advent calendar, a Lenten calendar often has windows or flaps containing "a scriptural verse for each day, a reflection question, and an action that is appropriate and achievable". The Bible verse for the day is frequently accompanied by an image relating to Lent. Christians often use Lenten calendars as a part of their Lenten devotions.

== See also ==
- Advent calendar
- Home altar
- Stations of the Cross
