= Home altar (Christianity) =

Shrine kept in the home of some Christians

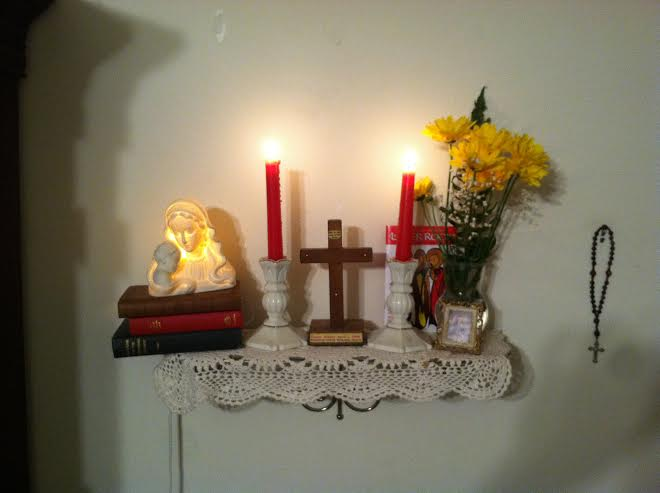
A home altar in a Methodist household, fixed on the eastern wall of the house

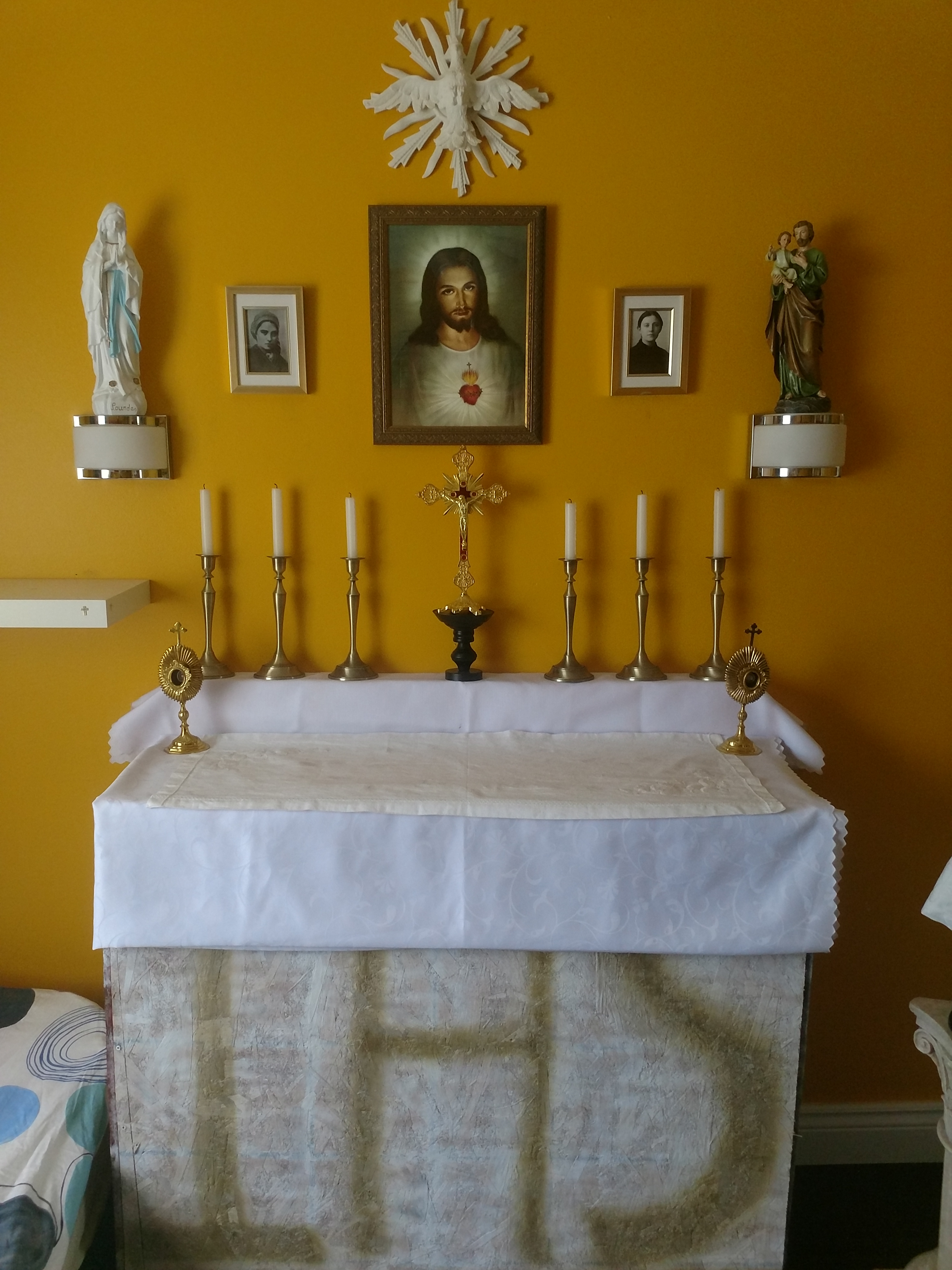
A homemade attached altar made from wood in a Traditional Catholic home. It combines devotional pictures and statues, as well as relics and candles.

A home altar or family altar is a shrine kept in the home of a Western Christian family used for Christian prayer and family worship. Home altars often contain a cross or crucifix, a copy of the Bible (especially a Family Bible), a breviary and/or other prayer book, a daily devotional, a headcovering (worn by many Christian women, especially during prayer and worship), icons of Jesus Christ and prayer beads, among other religious articles specific to the individual's Christian denomination, for example, the images of the saints for Catholics, the Small Catechism for Evangelical-Lutherans, and the Anglican prayer beads for Anglicans.

== History ==
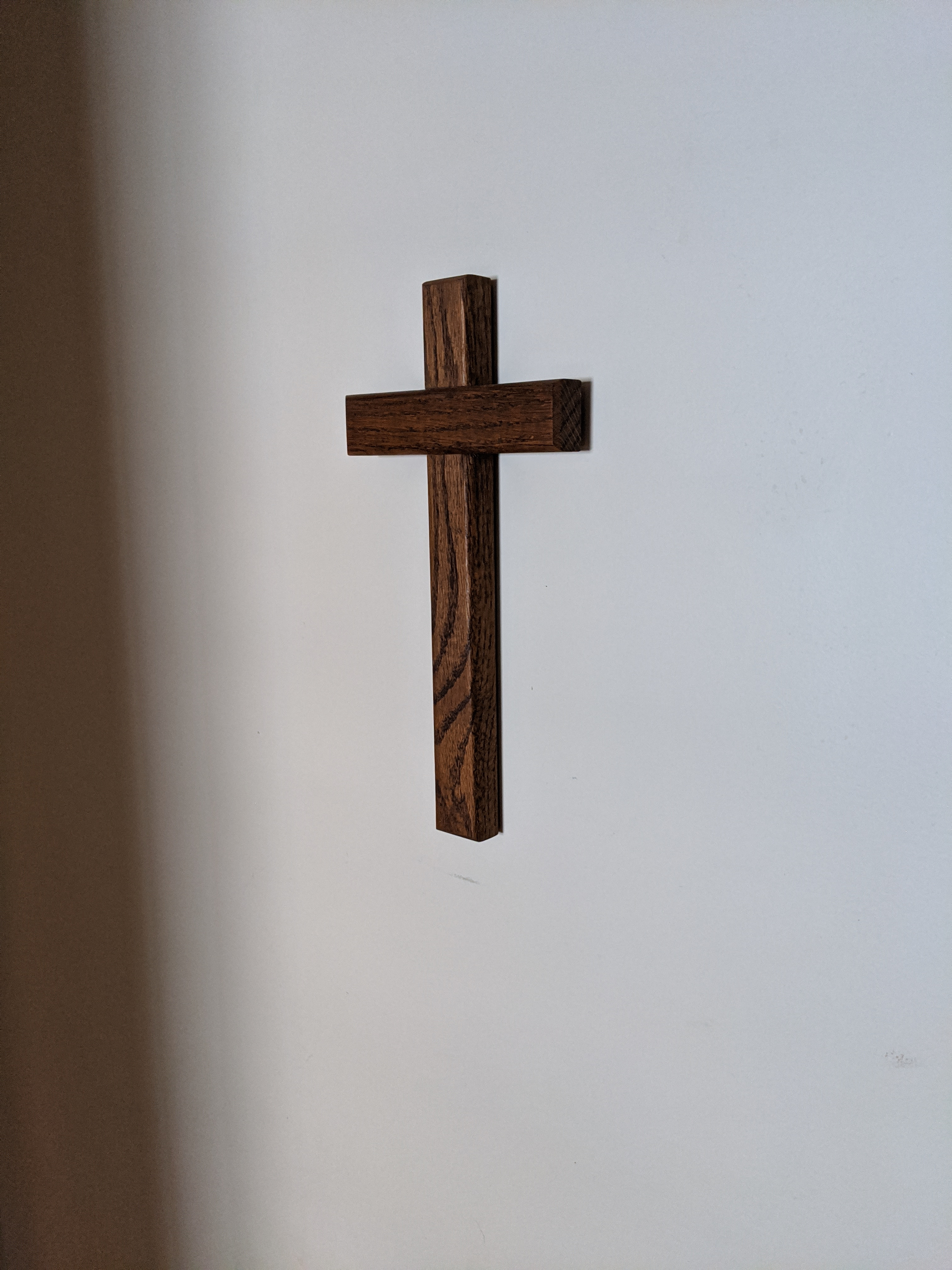
Believers have historically hung a Christian cross on the eastern wall of their homes to indicate the eastward direction towards which they focused their prayers.

The Christian Treasury traces the origin of the family altar to the prophet Abraham erecting one in the Old Testament (Genesis 12:7). Since at least the 2nd century, believers such as Hipparchus, hung or painted a Christian cross, to which they prostrated in front of, on the eastern wall of their home in order to indicate the eastward direction of prayer during the seven fixed prayer times, as an "expression of their undying belief in the coming again of Jesus was united to their conviction that the cross, 'the sign of the Son of Man,' would appear in the eastern heavens on his return (see Matthew 24:30)." Syrian Christians viewed their prayers in front of the Christian cross hanging on the eastern wall of their house as symbolizing "their souls facing God, talking with him, and sharing their spirituality with the Lord." Many Christians, such as those in the tradition of the Church of the East, continue the practice of hanging a Christian cross on the east wall of their house today; communicants in the Oriental Orthodox Churches today, such as those of the Indian Orthodox Church and Coptic Orthodox Church, pray the canonical hours contained in the Shehimo and Agpeya breviaries respectively (a practice done at seven fixed prayer times a day) facing eastward. Many Christians have built on this ancient custom, with those in the West erecting home altars and those in the East erecting icon corners, usually on the eastern wall of their dwelling place.

== Purpose and usage ==
Home altars usually are adorned with pairs of votive candles and sometimes a small vase of flowers. In many Christian households, individual family members, or the family as a whole, may gather to pray at the home altar. Christian hymns may also be sung there. Family altars are also used to promote the "development or intensification of personal piety and godly conduct."

It is common for Western Christians to have a prie-dieu in front of their home altar, which provides believers a space to place their Bible and breviary while kneeling before God in prayer. The home altars of many Eastern Christians, particularly those living in the Indian subcontinent, often have the Bible placed on a rehal for reverent display and reading. (Note: John Chrysostom, a prominent Church Father of Christianity revered in the Orthodox, Nestorian, Catholic, Lutheran and Anglican traditions, taught that people should wash their hands before picking up a copy of the Bible (he enjoined women to wear a headcovering if they were not already veiled at home prior to touching the Bible).) As with certain traditions of Oriental Christianity, some Western Orthodox Christians make use of the prayer rug to provide a clean space for offering Christian prayers to God. The candles that adorn the home altar are often those that have been blessed that year on Candlemas Day, a feast observed in the Catholic, Lutheran, and Anglican traditions, among others.

== Gallery ==
A home altar in an Evangelical-Lutheran household in Sweden

An Evangelical-Lutheran home altar in Sweden with icons, candles, the Bible, the Wreath of Christ and devotional books

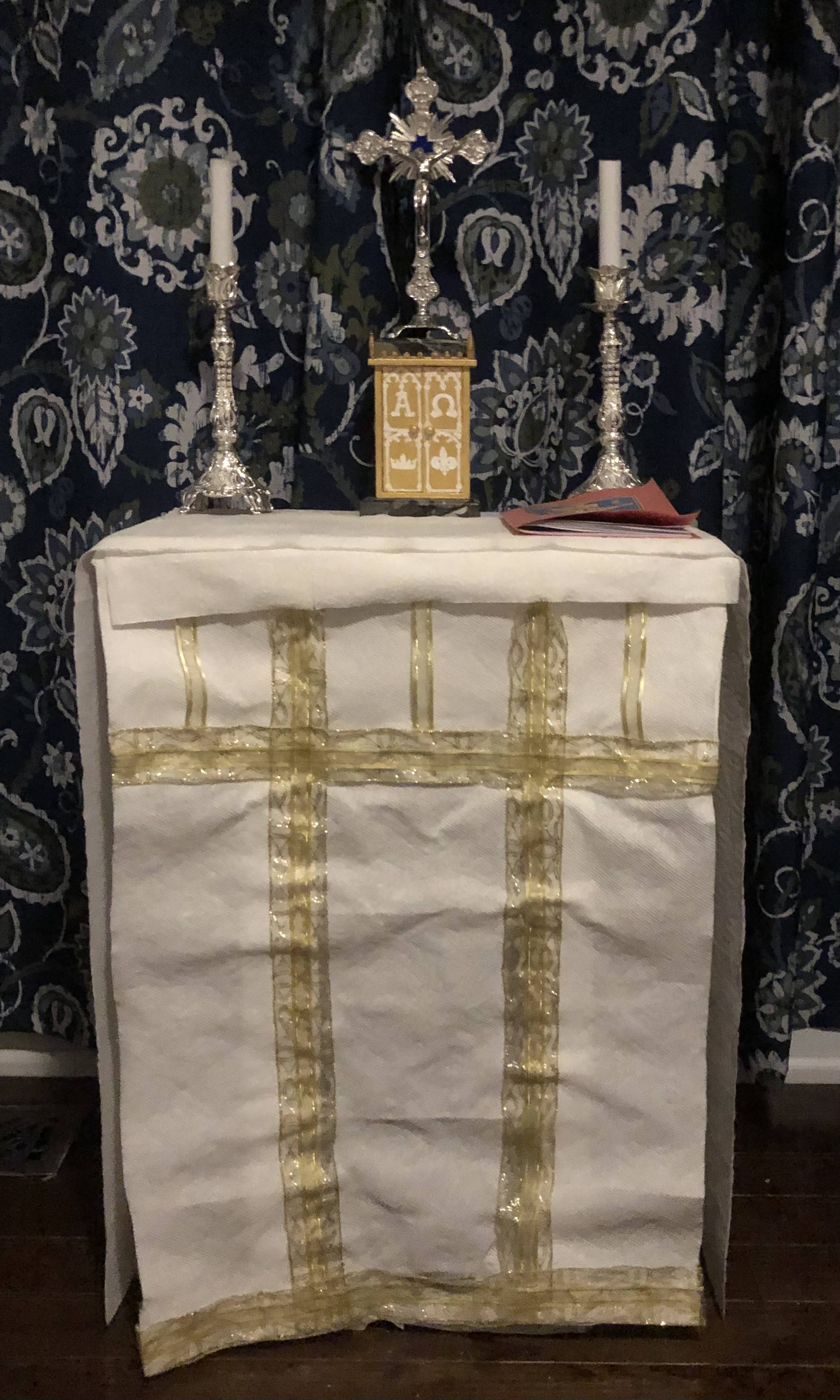
A Catholic home altar, with a set of candlesticks and crucifix, and a homemade altar frontal and tabernacle containing not the Blessed Sacrament, but a devotional object passed down as an heirloom instead

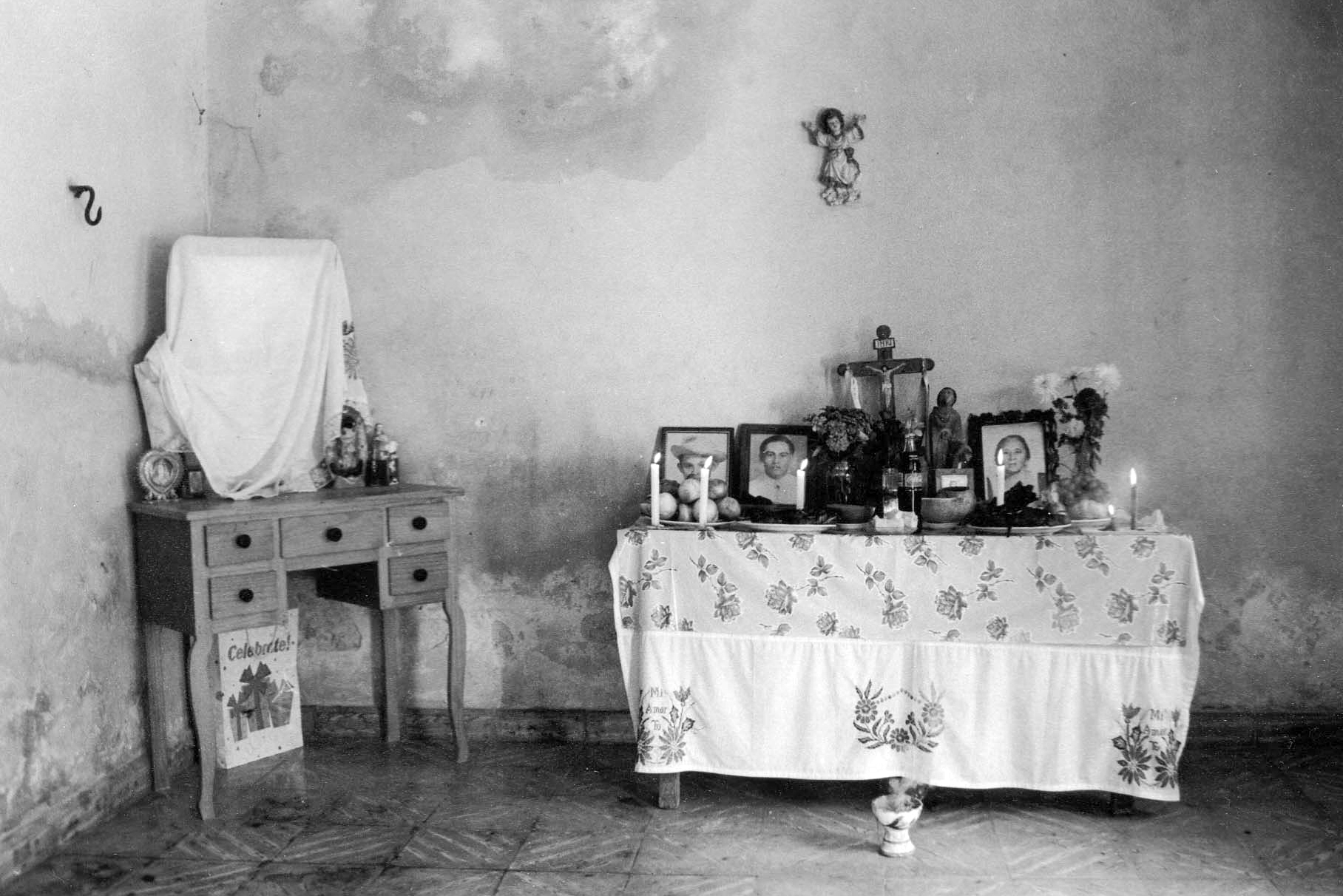
A home altar in Mexico

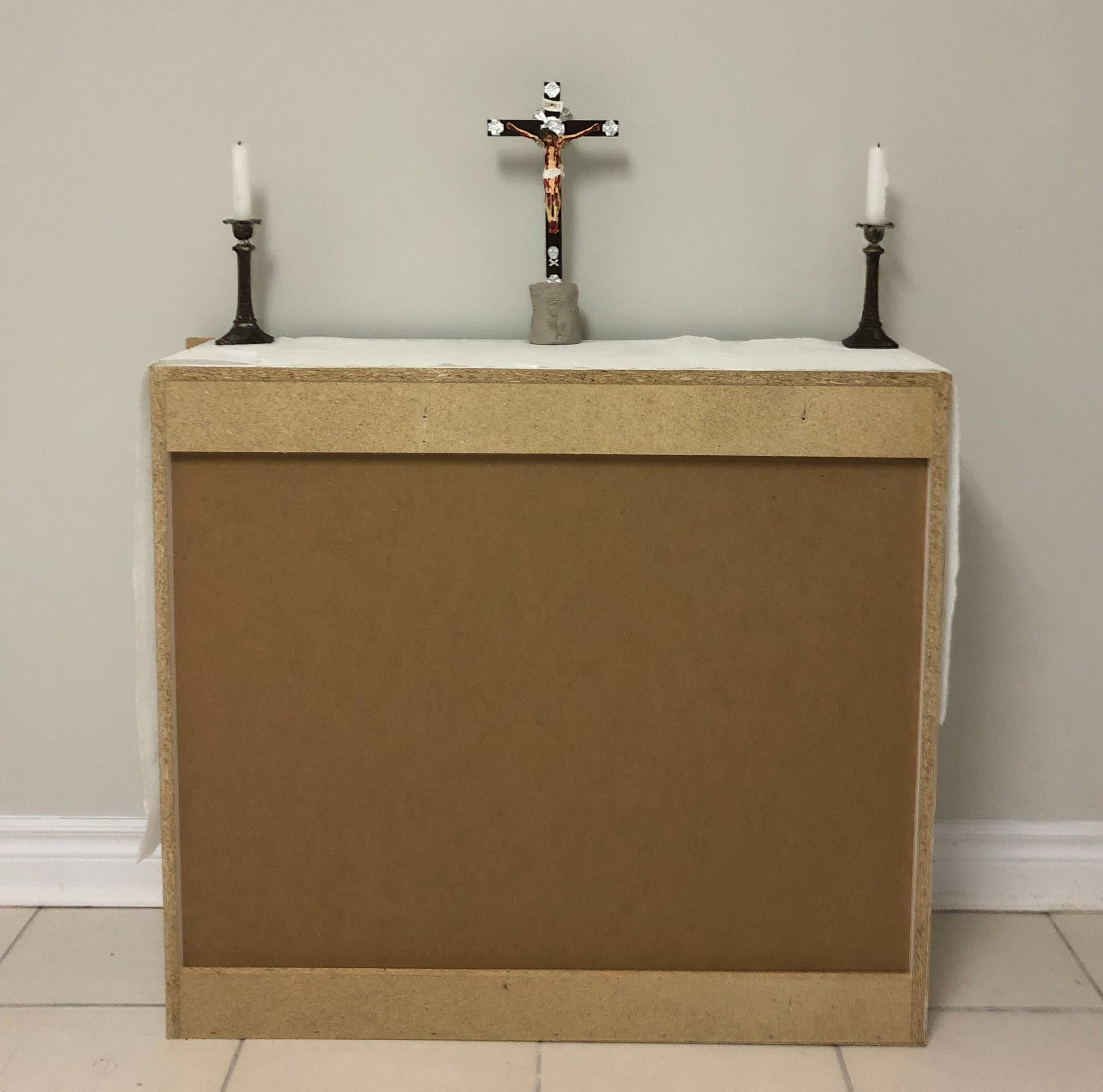
A simple Catholic home altar

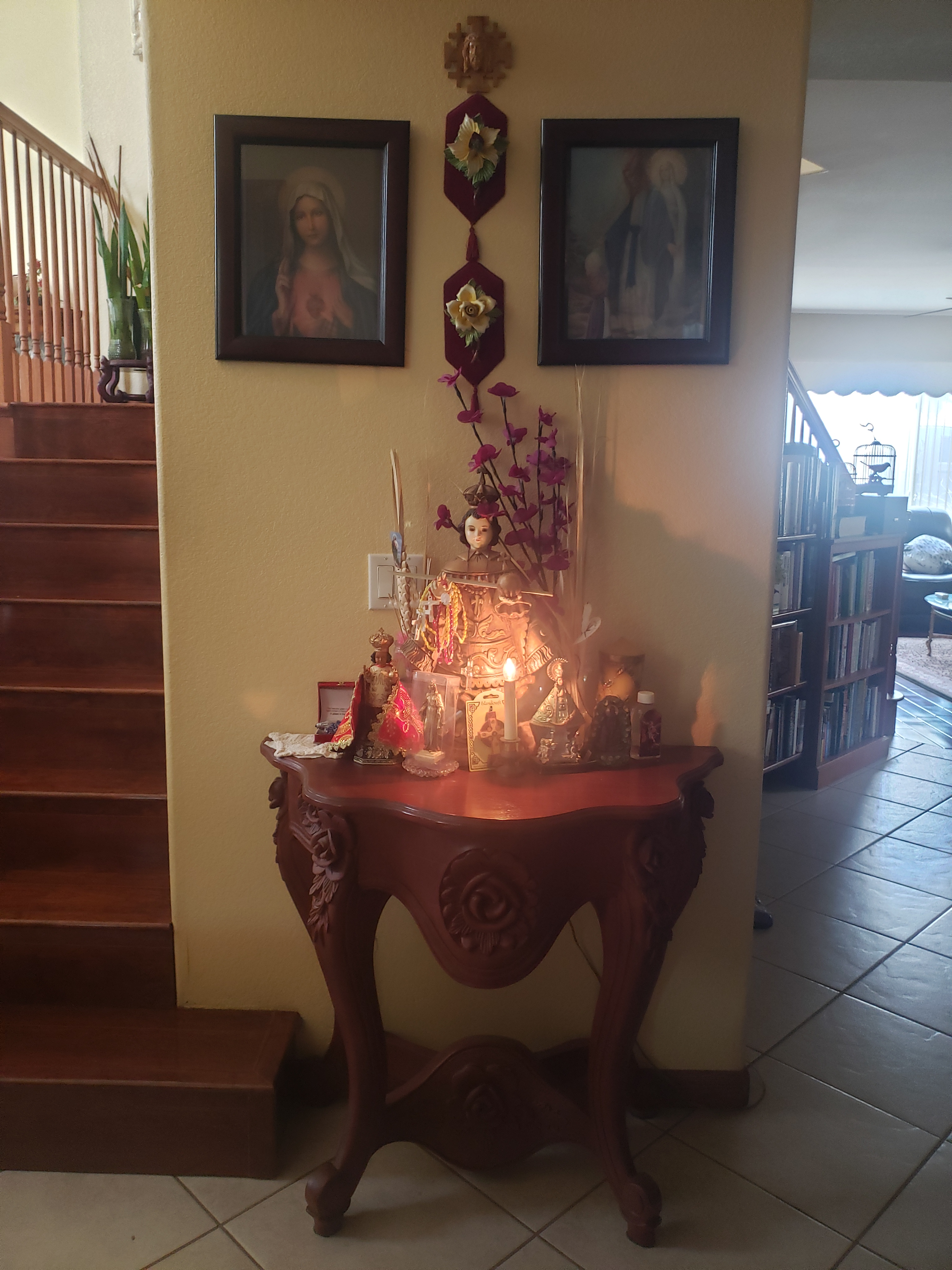
A Catholic home altar in California

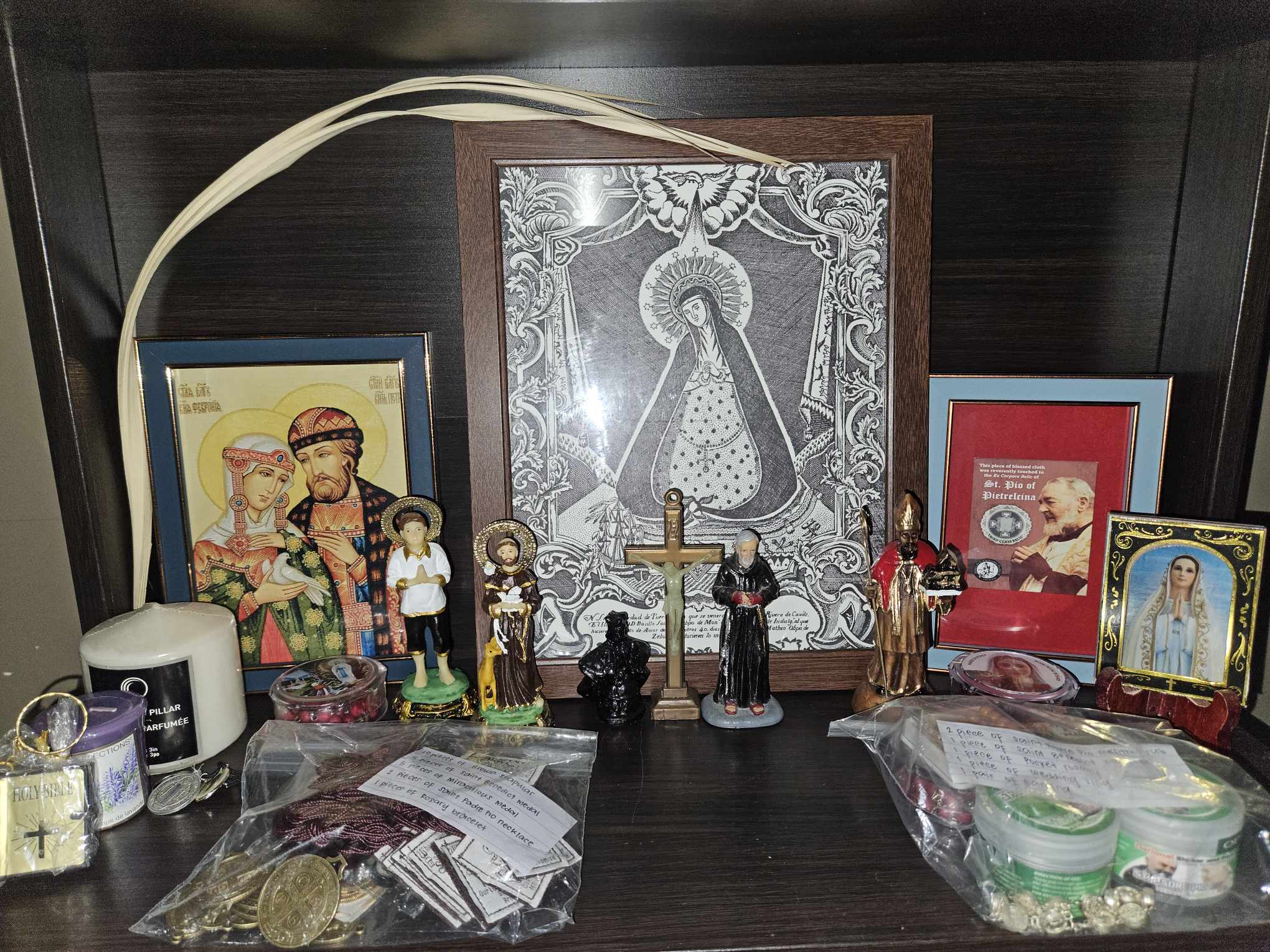
A Filipino Catholic home altar in Morden, Manitoba

== See also ==
- Washing before Christian prayer and worship
- Icon corner – analogous concept in Eastern Christianity
- Kamidana – analogous concept in Shinto
- Butsudan – analogous concept in Japanese Buddhism
- Cetiya – objects and places used by Theravada Buddhists to worship the Buddha
- Jain house temple – analogous concept in Jainism
- Wiccan altar – analogous concept in Wicca
- Lararium – analogous concept in Roman ancient religion
- Family worship
- Home stoup
- House church
- Proprietary chapel
- Spirit house
