= Christian prayer =

Activity in Christianity

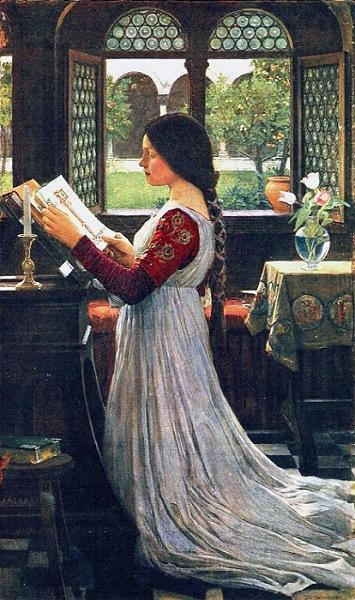
The Missal, by John William Waterhouse (1902), depicts a woman kneeling at a prie-dieu to pray.

Christian prayer is an important activity in Christian piety, with several different forms. Prayers may be spontaneous or read from written texts such as a breviary, which contains the canonical hours observed at fixed times. Common prayer gestures include folding hands, bowing the head, kneeling, and prostration.

The most prominent prayer among Christians is the Lord's Prayer, which according to the gospel accounts (e.g. Matthew 6:9-13) is how Jesus taught his disciples to pray. The injunction for Christians to pray the Lord's Prayer thrice daily was given in Didache 8, 2 f., which, in turn, was influenced by the Jewish practice of praying thrice daily found in the Old Testament, specifically in Psalm 55:17, which suggests "evening and morning and at noon", and Daniel 6:10, in which the prophet Daniel prays thrice a day. The early Christians thus came to recite the Lord's Prayer thrice a day at 9 am, 12 pm, and 3 pm, supplanting the former Amidah predominant in the Hebrew tradition; as such, many Lutheran and Anglican churches ring their church bells from belltowers three times a day: in the morning, at noon and in the evening summoning the Christian faithful to recite the Lord’s Prayer.

From the time of the Early Church, the practice of seven fixed prayer times has been taught; in Apostolic Tradition, Hippolytus instructed Christians to pray seven times a day "on rising, at the lighting of the evening lamp, at bedtime, at midnight" and "the third, sixth and ninth hours of the day, being hours associated with Christ's Passion." Oriental Orthodox Christians, such as Copts and Indians, use a breviary such as the Agpeya and Shehimo to pray the canonical hours seven times a day at fixed prayer times while facing in the eastward direction, in anticipation of the Second Coming of Jesus; this Christian practice has its roots in Psalm 119:164, in which the prophet David prays to God seven times a day. Church bells enjoin Christians to pray at these hours. Before praying, they wash their hands and face in order to be clean and present their best to God; shoes are removed to acknowledge that one is offering prayer before a holy God. In these Christian denominations, and in many others as well, it is customary for women to wear a Christian headcovering when praying. Many Christians have historically hung a Christian cross on the eastern wall of their houses to indicate the eastward direction of prayer during these seven prayer times.

There are two basic settings for Christian prayer: corporate (or public) and private. Corporate prayer includes prayer shared within the worship setting or other public places, especially on the Lord's Day, when many Christian assemble collectively. These prayers can be formal written prayers, such as the liturgies contained in the Lutheran Service Book and Book of Common Prayer, as well as informal ejaculatory prayers or extemporaneous prayers, such as those offered in Methodist camp meetings. Private prayer occurs with the individual praying either silently or aloud within the home setting; the use of a daily devotional and prayer book in the private prayer life of a Christian is common. In Western Christianity, the prie-dieu has been historically used for private prayer and many Christian homes possess home altars in the area where these are placed. In Eastern Christianity, believers often keep icon corners at which they pray, which are on the eastern wall of the house. Among Old Ritualists, a prayer rug known as a Podruchnik is used to keep one's face and hands clean during prostrations, as these parts of the body are used to make the sign of the cross. Spontaneous prayer in Christianity, often done in private settings, follows the basic form of adoration, contrition, thanksgiving and supplication, abbreviated as A.C.T.S.

== Historical development ==
=== New Testament ===
Prayer in the New Testament is presented as a positive command (Colossians 4:2; 1 Thessalonians 5:17). The people of God are challenged to include prayer in their everyday life, even in the busy struggles of marriage (1 Corinthians 7:5) as it is thought to bring the faithful closer to God. Throughout the New Testament, prayer is shown to be God's appointed method by which the faithful obtain what he has to bestow (Matthew 7:7–11; Matthew 9:24–29; Luke 11:13). Prayer, according to the Book of Acts, can be seen at the first moments of the church (Acts 3:1). The apostles regarded prayer as an essential part of their lives (Acts 6:4; Romans 1:9; Colossians 1:9). As such, the apostles frequently incorporated verses from Psalms into their writings. Romans 3:10–18 for example is borrowed from Psalm 14:1–3 and other psalms.

Lengthy passages of the New Testament are prayers or canticles (see also the Book of Odes), such as the prayer for forgiveness (Mark 11:25–26), the Lord's Prayer, the Magnificat (Luke 1:46–55), the Benedictus (Luke 1:68–79), Jesus' prayer to the one true God (John 17), exclamations such as, "Praise be to the God and Father of our Lord Jesus Christ" (Ephesians 1:3–14), the Believers' Prayer (Acts 4:23–31), "may this cup be taken from me" (Matthew 26:36–44), "Pray that you will not fall into temptation" (Luke 22:39–46), Stephen's Prayer (Acts 7:59–60), Simon Magus' Prayer (Acts 8:24), "pray that we may be delivered from wicked and evil men" (2 Thessalonians 3:1–2), and Maranatha (1 Corinthians 16:22).

=== Early Christianity ===
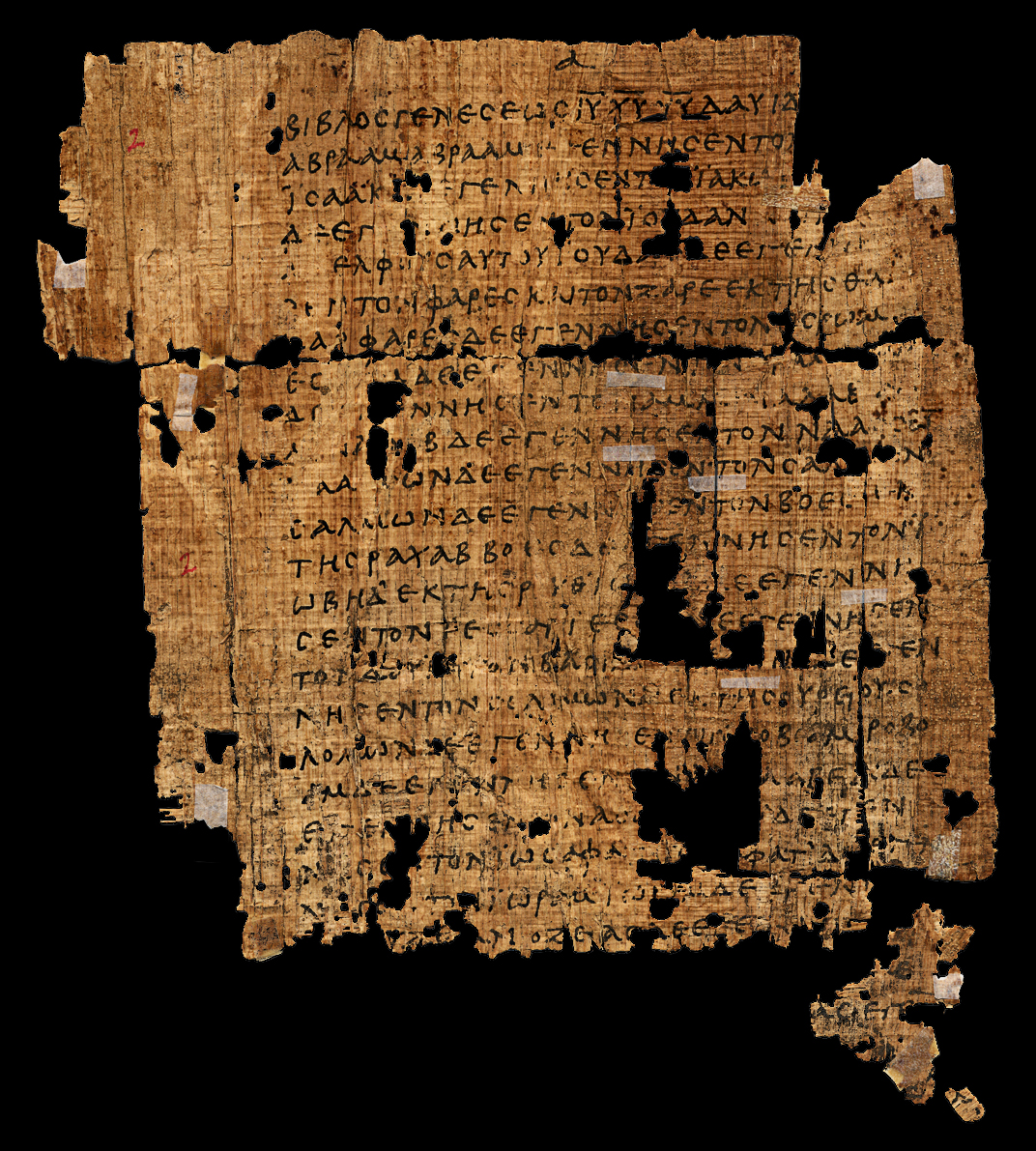
A page of Matthew, from Papyrus 1, c. 250

Prayer and the reading of Scripture were important elements of Early Christianity. In the early Church worship was inseparable from doctrine as reflected in the statement: lex orandi, lex credendi, i.e. the law of belief is the law of prayer. Early Christian liturgies highlight the importance of prayer.

The Lord's Prayer was an essential element in the meetings held by the very early Christians, and it was spread by them as they preached Christianity in new lands. Over time, a variety of prayers were developed as the production of early Christian literature intensified.

As early as the 2nd century, Christians indicated the eastward direction of prayer by placing a Christian cross on the eastern wall of their house or church, prostrating in front of it as they prayed at seven fixed prayer times.

By the 3rd century Origen had advanced the view of "Scripture as a sacrament". Origen's methods of interpreting Scripture and praying on them were learned by Ambrose of Milan, who towards the end of the 4th century taught them to Augustine of Hippo, thereby introducing them into the monastic traditions of the Western Church thereafter.

Early models of Christian monastic life emerged in the 4th century, as the Desert Fathers began to seek God in the deserts of Palestine and Egypt. These early communities gave rise to the tradition of a Christian life of "constant prayer" in a monastic setting which eventually resulted in meditative practices in the Eastern Church during the Byzantine period.

=== Meditation in the Middle Ages ===
The four movements of Lectio divina: read, meditate, pray, contemplate

During the Middle Ages, the monastic traditions of both Western and Eastern Christianity moved beyond vocal prayer to Christian meditation. These progressions resulted in two distinct and different meditative practices: Lectio Divina in the West and hesychasm in the East. Hesychasm involves the repetition of the Jesus Prayer, but Lectio Divina uses different Scripture passages at different times and although a passage may be repeated a few times, Lectio Divina is not repetitive in nature.

In the Western Church, by the 6th century, Benedict of Nursia and Pope Gregory I had initiated the formal methods of scriptural prayer called Lectio Divina. With the motto Ora et labora (i.e. pray and work), daily life in a Benedictine monastery consisted of three elements: liturgical prayer, manual labor and Lectio Divina, a quiet prayerful reading of the Bible. This slow and thoughtful reading of Scripture, and the ensuing pondering of its meaning, was their meditation.

Early in the 12th century, Bernard of Clairvaux was instrumental in re-emphasizing the importance of Lectio Divina within the Cistercian order. Bernard also emphasized the role of the Holy Spirit in contemplative prayer and compared it to a kiss by the Eternal Father which allows a union with God.

The progression from Bible reading, to meditation, to loving regard for God, was first formally described by Guigo II, a Carthusian monk who died late in the 12th century. Guigo II's book The Ladder of Monks is considered the first description of methodical prayer in the western mystical tradition.

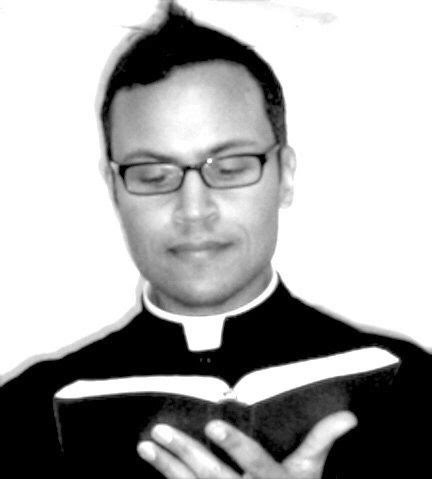
Priest in Italy reading from Holy Scripture in preparation for meditation and contemplative prayer

In Eastern Christianity, the monastic traditions of "constant prayer" that traced back to the Desert Fathers and Evagrius Pontikos established the practice of hesychasm and influenced John Climacus' book The Ladder of Divine Ascent by the 7th century. These meditative prayers were promoted and supported by Gregory Palamas in the 14th century.

=== Contemplative prayer ===
In the Western Church, during the 15th century, reforms of the clergy and monastic settings were undertaken by the two Venetians, Lorenzo Giustiniani and Louis Barbo. Both men considered methodical prayer and meditation as essential tools for the reforms they were undertaking. Barbo, who died in 1443, wrote a treatise on prayer titled Forma orationis et meditionis otherwise known as Modus meditandi. He described three types of prayer; vocal prayer, best suited for beginners; meditation, oriented towards those who are more advanced; and contemplation as the highest form of prayer, only obtainable after the meditation stage. Based on the request of Pope Eugene IV, Barbo introduced these methods to Valladolid, Spain and by the end of the 15th century they were being used at the abbey of Montserrat. These methods then influenced Garcias de Cisneros, who in turn influenced Ignatius of Loyola.

The Eastern Orthodox Church has a similar three level hierarchy of prayer. The first level prayer is again vocal prayer, the second level is meditation (also called "inward prayer" or "discursive prayer") and the third level is contemplative prayer, in which a much closer relationship with God is cultivated.

=== Language in prayer ===
Many conservative Christians use "Thee, Thou, Thy and Thine when addressing God" in prayer; in the Plymouth Brethren catechism Gathering Unto His Name, Norman Crawford explains the practice:

The English language does contain reverential and respectful forms of the second person pronoun which allow us to show reverence in speaking to God. It has been a very long tradition that these reverential forms are used in prayer. In a day of irreverence, how good to display in every way that we can that "He (God) is not a man as I am" (Job 9:32).

When referring to God, "thou" (as with other pronouns) is often capitalized, e.g. "For Thou hast delivered my soul from death" (Psalm 56:12–13).

== Types of prayer ==
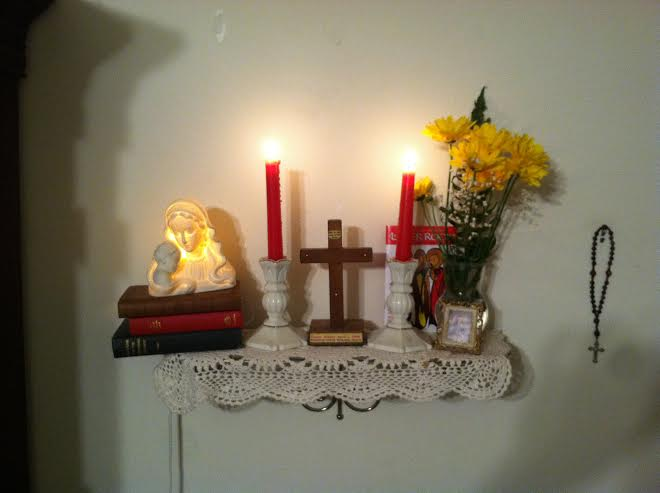
Some Christians have a home altar at which they may pray and read Christian devotional literature.

Christian prayer can be divided into different categories, varying by denomination and tradition. Over time, theologians have studied different types of prayer. For example, theologian Gilbert W. Stafford divided prayer into eight different types based on New Testament scripture. Interpretations of prayer in the New Testament and the Christian faith as a whole widely vary, leading to the practice of different types of prayer.

=== Daily prayer ===
==== Canonical hours ====
In Apostolic Tradition, Hippolytus instructed Christians to pray seven times a day "on rising, at the lighting of the evening lamp, at bedtime, at midnight" and "the third, sixth and ninth hours of the day, being hours associated with Christ's Passion."

Eastern Christians of the Alexandrian Rite and Syriac Rite, use a breviary such as the Agpeya and Shehimo to pray the canonical hours seven times a day at fixed prayer times while facing in the eastward direction, in anticipation of the Second Coming of Jesus; this Christian practice has its roots in Psalm 118:164, in which the prophet David is described as praying to God seven times a day. These Christians incorporate prostrations in their prayers, "prostrating three times in the name of the Trinity; at the end of each Psalm … while saying the ‘Alleluia’; and multiple times during the more than forty Kyrie eleisons" as with the Copts and thrice during the Qauma prayer, at the words "Crucified for us, Have mercy on us!", thrice during the recitation of the Nicene Creed at the words "And was incarnate of the Holy Spirit...", "And was crucified for us...", & "And on the third day rose again...", as well as thrice during the Prayer of the Cherubim while praying the words "Blessed is the glory of the Lord, from His place forever!" as with the Indians. Before praying, Oriental Christians wash their hands, face and feet out of respect for God; shoes are removed in order to acknowledge that one is offering prayer before a holy God. In this Christian denomination, and in many others as well, it is customary for women to wear a Christian head-covering when praying.

In the Lutheran Churches, the canonical hours are contained in breviaries such as The Brotherhood Prayer Book and For All the Saints: A Prayer Book for and by the Church, while in the Catholic Church they are known as the Liturgy of the Hours. Historically, the Methodist tradition emphasized the praying of the canonical hours as an "essential practice" in being a disciple of Jesus.

==== Lord's Prayer ====
The injunction for Christians to pray the Lord's Prayer thrice daily was given in Didache 8, 2 f., which, in turn, was influenced by the Jewish practice of praying thrice daily found in the Old Testament, specifically in Psalm 55:17, which suggests "evening and morning and at noon", and Daniel 6:10, in which the prophet Daniel prays thrice a day. The early Christians came to pray the Lord's Prayer thrice a day at 9 am, 12 pm and 3 pm, supplanting the former Amidah predominant in the Hebrew tradition. As such, in Christianity, many Lutheran and Anglican churches ring their church bells from belltowers three times a day, summoning the Christian faithful to recite the Lord’s Prayer.

==== Sign of the Cross ====
The sign of the cross is a short prayer used daily by many Christians, especially those of the Catholic, Lutheran, Oriental Orthodox, Eastern Orthodox, Methodist and Anglican traditions. Apart from its daily use in private prayer, it is widely used in corporate prayer by these Christian denominations. The Small Catechism, a catechism used in the Lutheran Churches, instructs believers "to make the sign of the cross at both the beginning and the end of the day as a beginning to daily prayers." It specifically instructs Christians: "When you get out of bed, bless yourself with the holy cross and say ‘In the name of God, the Father, the Son, and the Holy Spirit. Amen.’"

==== Mealtime prayer ====
Christians often pray to ask God to thank Him for and bless their food before consuming it at the time of eating meals, such as supper. These prayers vary among Christian denominations, e.g. the common table prayer is used by communicants of the Lutheran Churches and the Moravian Church.

=== Seasonal prayer ===
Many denominations use specific prayers geared to the season of the Christian Liturgical Year, such as Advent, Christmas, Lent and Easter. Some of these prayers are found in the Roman Breviary, the Liturgy of the Hours, the Orthodox Euchologion, Evangelical Lutheran Worship, and the Anglican Book of Common Prayer.

In the seasons of Advent and Lent, many Christians add the reading of a daily devotional to their prayer life; items that aid in prayer, such as an Advent wreath or Lenten calendar are unique to those seasons of the Church Year.

=== Intercession of saints ===
The ancient church, in both Eastern Christianity and Western Christianity, developed a tradition of asking for the intercession of (deceased) saints, and this remains the practice of most Eastern Orthodox, Oriental Orthodox, Roman Catholic, as well as some Lutheran and Anglican churches. Most of the Reformed Churches, however, rejected this practice, largely on the basis of belief in the sole mediatorship of Christ.

=== Meditation and contemplative prayer ===
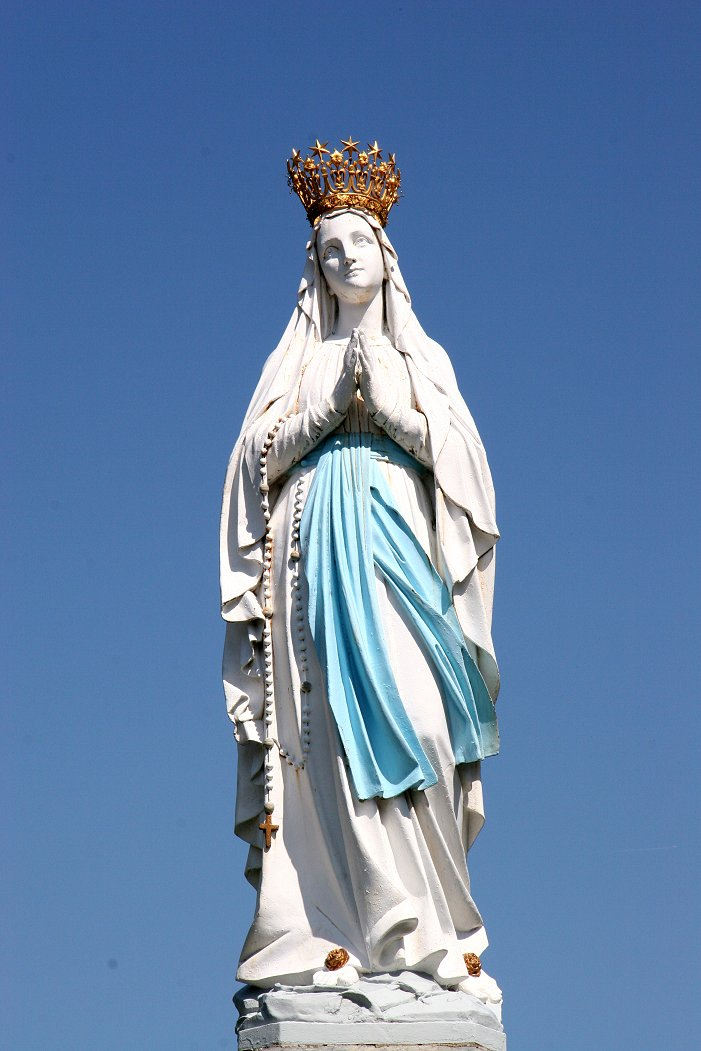
A statue of Mary with the Rosary in Lourdes, France

A broad, three stage characterization of prayer begins with vocal prayer, then moves on to a more structured form in terms of meditation, then reaches the multiple layers of contemplation, or intercession.

Christian meditation is a structured attempt to get in touch with and deliberately reflect upon the revelations of God. The word meditation comes from the Latin word meditārī, which has a range of meanings including to reflect on, to study and to practice. Christian meditation is the process of deliberately focusing on specific thoughts (such as a bible passage) and reflecting on their meaning in the context of the love of God.

Christian meditation aims to heighten the personal relationship based on the love of God that marks Christian communion.

At times there may be no clear-cut boundary between Christian meditation and Christian contemplation, and they overlap. Meditation serves as a foundation on which the contemplative life stands, the practice by which someone begins the state of contemplation. In contemplative prayer, this activity is curtailed, so that contemplation has been described as "a gaze of faith", "a silent love".

Meditation and contemplation on the life of Jesus in the New Testament are components of the Rosary and are central to spiritual retreats and to the prayer that grows out of these retreats.

=== Intercessory prayer ===
This kind of prayer involves the believer taking the role of an intercessor, praying on behalf of another individual, group or community, or even a nation.

=== Ejaculatory prayer ===
Ejaculatory prayer is the use of very brief exclamations. Saint Augustine remarked that the Egyptian Christians who withdrew to a solitary life "are said to say frequent prayers, but very brief ones that are tossed off as in a rush, so that a vigilant and keen intention, which is very necessary for one who prays, may not fade away and grow dull over longer periods".

Examples of such prayers are given in the old Raccolta under the numbers 19, 20, 38, 57, 59, 63, 77, 82, 83, 133, 154, 166, 181.

They are also known as aspirations, invocations or exclamations and include the Jesus Prayer.

Johnson's Dictionary defined "ejaculation" as "a short prayer darted out occasionally, without solemn retirement". Such pious ejaculations are part also of the liturgy of the Church of England.

=== Listening prayer ===
Listening prayer is a traditional form of Christian prayer. Listening prayer requires those praying to sit in silence in the presence of God. It can, but need not, be preceded by a scripture reading. This method of prayer is most fully explored in the works of saints such as Teresa of Avila and the Carmelite way of life.

=== Silent prayer ===
Silent prayer is mental prayer, where no actual words are said out loud, as God is said to be able to hear thoughts. In 2020s Britain this form of prayer outside abortion clinics became politically controversial.

=== Child's prayer ===
A Christian child's prayer is typically short, rhyming, or has a memorable tune. It is usually said before bedtime, to give thanks for a meal, or as a nursery rhyme. Many of these prayers are either quotes from the Bible, or set traditional texts.

== Prayer books and aids to prayer ==
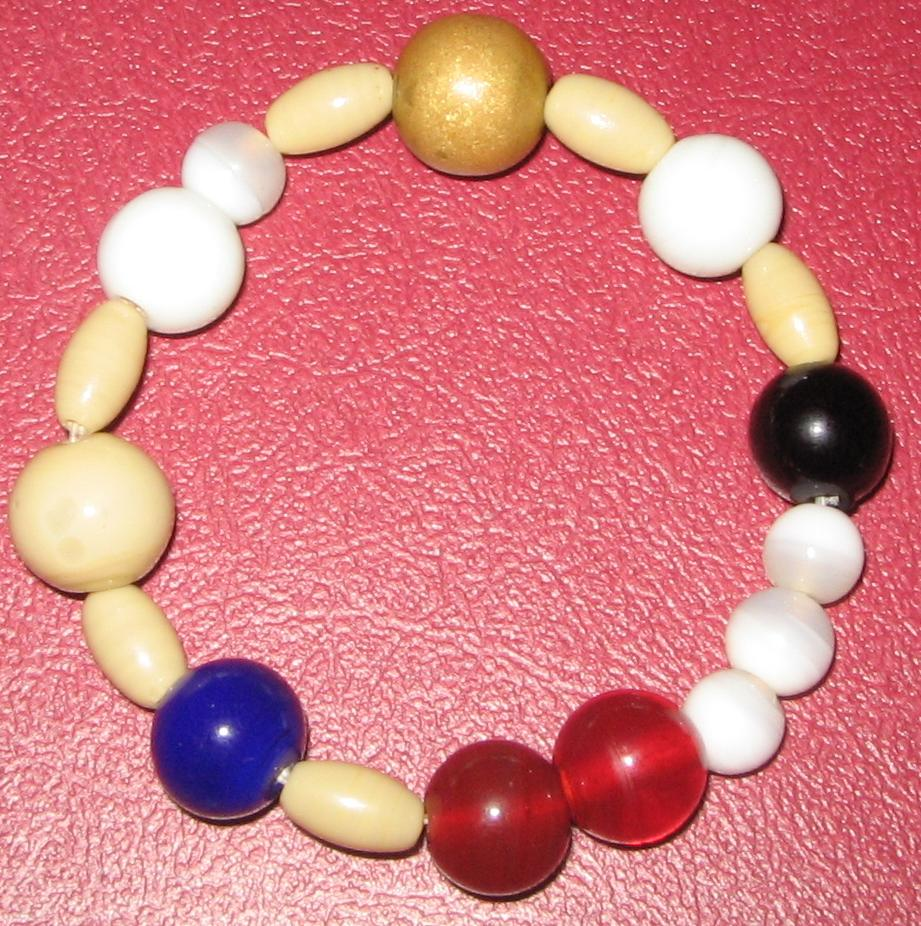
The Wreath of Christ, a set of prayer beads used by Lutheran Christians

Prayer books are often used by Christians. There is no one prayerbook containing a set liturgy used by all Christians, but many Christian denominations have their own local prayerbooks, for example:

- Agpeya also known as the Book of Hours for the Coptic Orthodox Christians of Egypt. The book is a collection of texts from the gospels, epistles and most importantly the book of Psalms as well as ancient prayers of the Church Fathers; seven main prayers are distributed over the seven fixed prayer times of the day with relevant texts about every particular hour from the Bible.
- Agenda, name for book for liturgies, especially in the Lutheran Church.
- Book of Common Prayer (the traditional Anglican prayer book, still in use or modified by the constituent churches of the Anglican Communion, and one of the most influential prayerbooks in the English language)
- Shehimo, the breviary of the Indian Orthodoxy containing the canonical hours for the seven times of the day
- The Book of Psalms
- The Raccolta, a book of indulgenced prayers used by Catholics
- The Roman Breviary (Traditional Roman Catholic Monastic Hours)

Objects used to support prayer include prayer beads such as chaplets, and images and icons are also associated with prayers in some Christian traditions.

== Unity of prayer and action ==
Many writers have observed that Christian prayer and other activities should not be separated from each other. The Second Vatican Council spoke of "coordination and unity of life" as desirable, especially in the lives of priests:

Neither the mere external performance of the works of the ministry, nor the exclusive engagement in pious devotion, although very helpful, can bring about this necessary coordination. Priests can arrive at this only by following the example of Christ our Lord in their ministry.

Josemaría Escrivá develops the idea of a "unity of life" in his writings, observing that

There is in fact only one life that we live, in its two aspects: on the one hand, our life in this world with all it activities, offered up to God, performed to the best of our ability, that is, sanctified; and on the other hand, our life in the spirit, our interior life, our life of prayer and mortification. This unity of life demands that the Christian quest for both divine and human perfection, going much beyond merely praying, even to the point of clashing with the mentality of this world.

== See also ==
- Christian mysticism
- Intercession
- Roman Catholic prayer
- Roman Catholic prayers to Jesus
