= Home stoup =

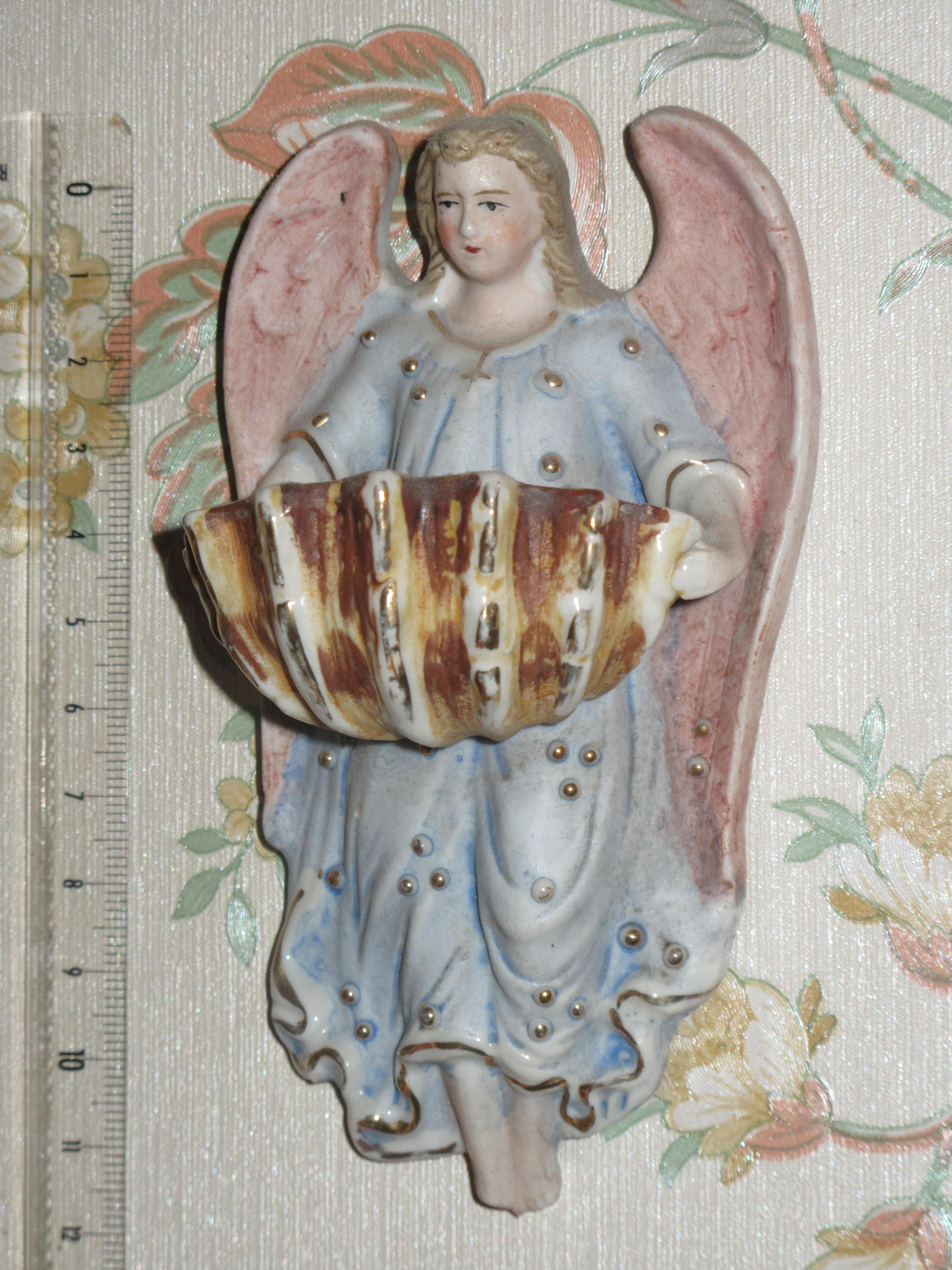
French home stoup

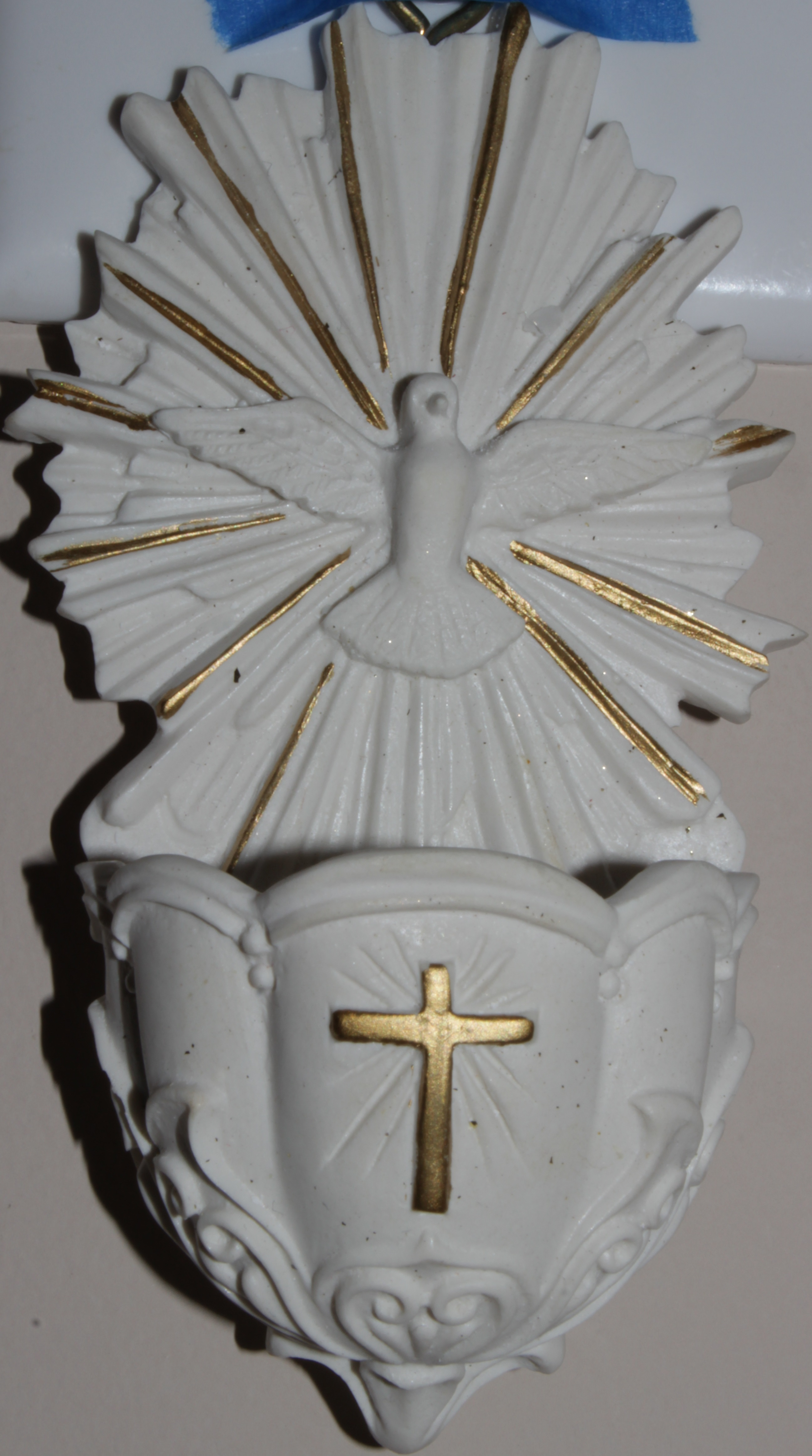
A Holy Spirit–themed stoup

A home stoup is a small stoup with a small bowl and a decorated plaque that Christians in the Roman Catholic, Anglican, and Lutheran traditions hang inside homes, either at the house's entrance or, more commonly, on a bedroom wall at the head of the bed. Sometime a small blessed branch of boxwood is placed behind the stoup, or a rosary is hung on the stoup.

The small bowl contains holy water so that the house's inhabitants could cross themselves in the morning and make the sign of the cross over their beds at night.

The use of these stoups began in the earliest centuries of the Christian Church. They were made of both expensive (gold, silver, etc.) and cheap (faience, ceramic, wood) materials; dependent on the fortunes of their owners. They were handmade with a painting or relief of Jesus, the Cross, the Virgin Mary, an angel or other religious subjects.

Most of these stoups were destroyed or disappeared during the French Revolution in 1789 and in following years, due to its policy of de-Christianization.

In the nineteenth century, most of these stoups were made in ceramics. Some were unique in bearing the name of their owner. They were given as gifts on special occasions, such as births, first Communions, confirmations and weddings. These stoups were often handed down the generations, but their use decreased in France after 1900, although some believers continue to use them today. Home stoups are also collected by art-lovers.

== See also ==
- Holy water font
- Home altar
