= Family worship =

Private method in Christian worship

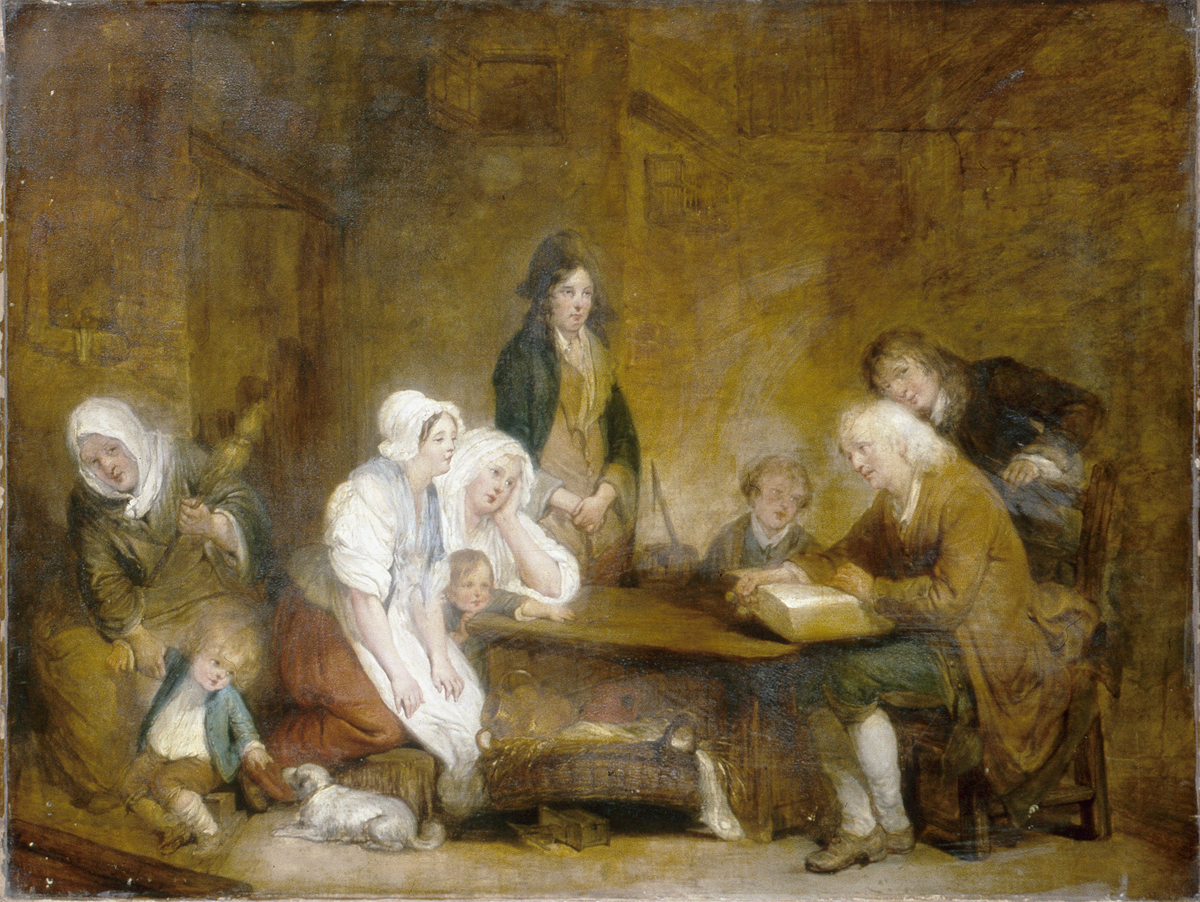
Family Worship, painting by Jean-Baptiste Greuze

Family worship, or family prayer, involves prayers said together in the private homes of Christian families, and includes bible reading or the use of bible stories, and singing of psalms and hymns.

== Denominational practices ==
- Traditionally, Catholic families have prayed together and children have learned to pray through participation in family prayer. Grace before meals is an example of a Catholic traditional practice. A familiar aphorism is "The family that prays together stays together".
- During the Protestant Reformation, daily Mass was simplified in order to allow wider participation by laypeople. In the Reformed tradition, it became more common especially in England and Scotland in the 17th century to emphasize daily morning and evening services in the home led by fathers to replace the morning and evening prayer services. Puritan minister Richard Baxter gave lengthy instructions in his Christian Directory for family worship.
- The General Assembly of the Church of Scotland added a chapter to the 1647 Westminster Directory for Worship on family prayer shortly after its adoption.
- Nonconformist minister Matthew Henry also wrote on family worship in his A Method for Prayer, as well as a collection of psalms and canticles for family use called Family Hymns. James W. Alexander, son of Princeton theologian Archibald Alexander wrote Thoughts on Family Worship in the nineteenth century. The rise of pietism saw a decline in the importance placed on the unity of the family, and family devotions were by and large replaced with private devotions, which were significantly shorter than traditional family worship. Small group activities are also sometimes considered a replacement for family worship.
- Family worship is important among Conservative Friends:

Be diligent in the reading of the Bible and other spiritually helpful writings. Gather daily in your families for worship. Such times have a special value in bringing little children, especially into the experience of united worship, and so preparing them for the larger meeting for worship, as they learn in silence to bow to the power of God.
—The Book of Discipline of Ohio Yearly Meeting of the Religious Society of Friends (2022)

- In the Malankara Orthodox Syrian Church, the Book of Common Prayer or Shehimo is used by the families for daily prayers outside of church.

== See also ==
- Reformed worship
