= Daily devotional =

Religious publication with readings for each day

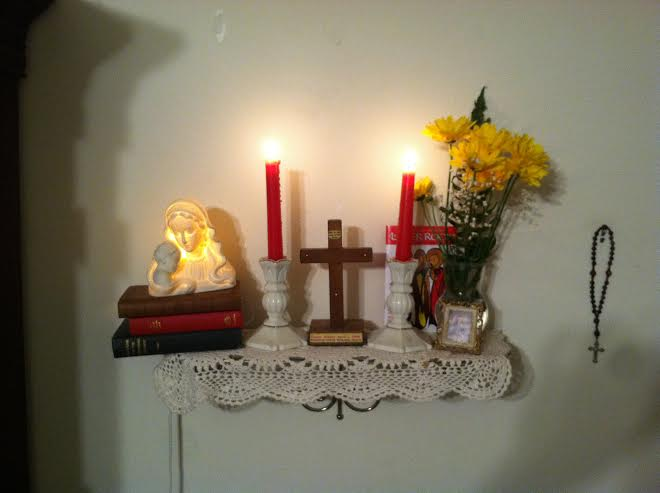
The Upper Room daily devotional sits behind a vase on a Methodist Christian home altar.

A daily devotional is a religious publication that provides a specific spiritual reading for each calendar day. Many daily devotionals take the form of one year devotional books, with many being tailored specifically for children, teenagers, students, men and women.

Traditionally, daily devotionals came in the format of a book, with one reading passage for each day, and often a reflection and prayer. With the advent of online content, daily devotionals come in multiple formats including apps, blogs, websites, and emails (electronic daily devotional). There continues to be a multitude of devotional books and calendars, in addition to numerous online devotionals, that are tailored to a variety of recipient, religious denomination, or view. Daily devotionals differ from traditional breviaries, which are used by Christians to pray the canonical hours at fixed prayer times every day, in that daily devotionals can be used at leisure.

Daily devotionals have a long tradition in Christian religious communities, with the earliest known example being the Gælic Feliré written in Ireland in the Ninth Century. They tend to be associated with a daily time of prayer and meditation. Churchgoers often get one-year devotional books from Christian bookstores and give these as gifts for life events, such as baptisms, first communions, confirmations, graduations, weddings, among other occasions.

== Examples ==
Beside The Still Waters is a daily devotional widely used by adherents of the Anabaptist Christian tradition. Each page of the "devotional begins with a Scripture reference and verse on a theme" with a subsequent "reflection on the theme, followed by an inspirational aphorism or a line from a hymn, and a few additional biblical references for those who would like to read through the entire Bible in a year." The themes are "temptation, trust, hypocrisy, nonconformity, [and] integrity" which are combined with "a short story or illustration with a biblically based admonition."

Lutheran Hour Ministries makes daily devotions specifically for the liturgical seasons of Advent and Lent, in addition to other parts of the Church Year, such as Portals of Prayer.

Daily Watchwords is the daily devotional and prayer book used by the Moravian Church.

Daily devotionals such as My Utmost for His Highest, while common among Christians, can be found in many other traditions as well. Classic examples of devotionals include Leo Tolstoy's The Reading Circle.

== See also ==
- Anglican devotions
- Christian devotional literature
- Daf Yomi
- Electronic daily devotional
- Our Daily Bread
- Roman Catholic devotions
