= Ramsha =

Ramsha in Syriac Aramaic script.

Ramsha (Classical Syriac: ܪܡܫܐ) is the Aramaic and East Syriac Rite term for the evening Christian liturgy followed as a part of the seven canonical hours or Divine Office, roughly equivalent to Vespers in Western Christianity. It's also called Ramsho in the West Syriac Rite. It is used in the Syriac churches of the East Syriac tradition, including the Assyrian Church of the East of Iraq, the Ancient Church of the East of Iraq, the East Syriac Saint Thomas Christians of the Malabar coast, Kerala, India (Syro Malabar Catholic Church and Chaldean Syrian Church), and the Chaldean Catholic Church of Iraq. The Chaldean Catholic and Syro-Malabar Churches are all Eastern Catholic churches in full communion with the Catholic Church.

In the East Syriac tradition, a liturgical day begins with the Ramsha during evening at 6:00 pm which draws direct reference from Genesis 1:5. The Second Vatican Council made it clear that the canonical hours, referred to as the "Liturgy of the Hours" within the new form of the Roman Rite, are the official prayers of the Catholic Church along with the celebration of the Eucharist, which is done in the Holy Qurbana or Qurbono in the Syriac tradition.

== Canonical hours in the Syriac tradition ==
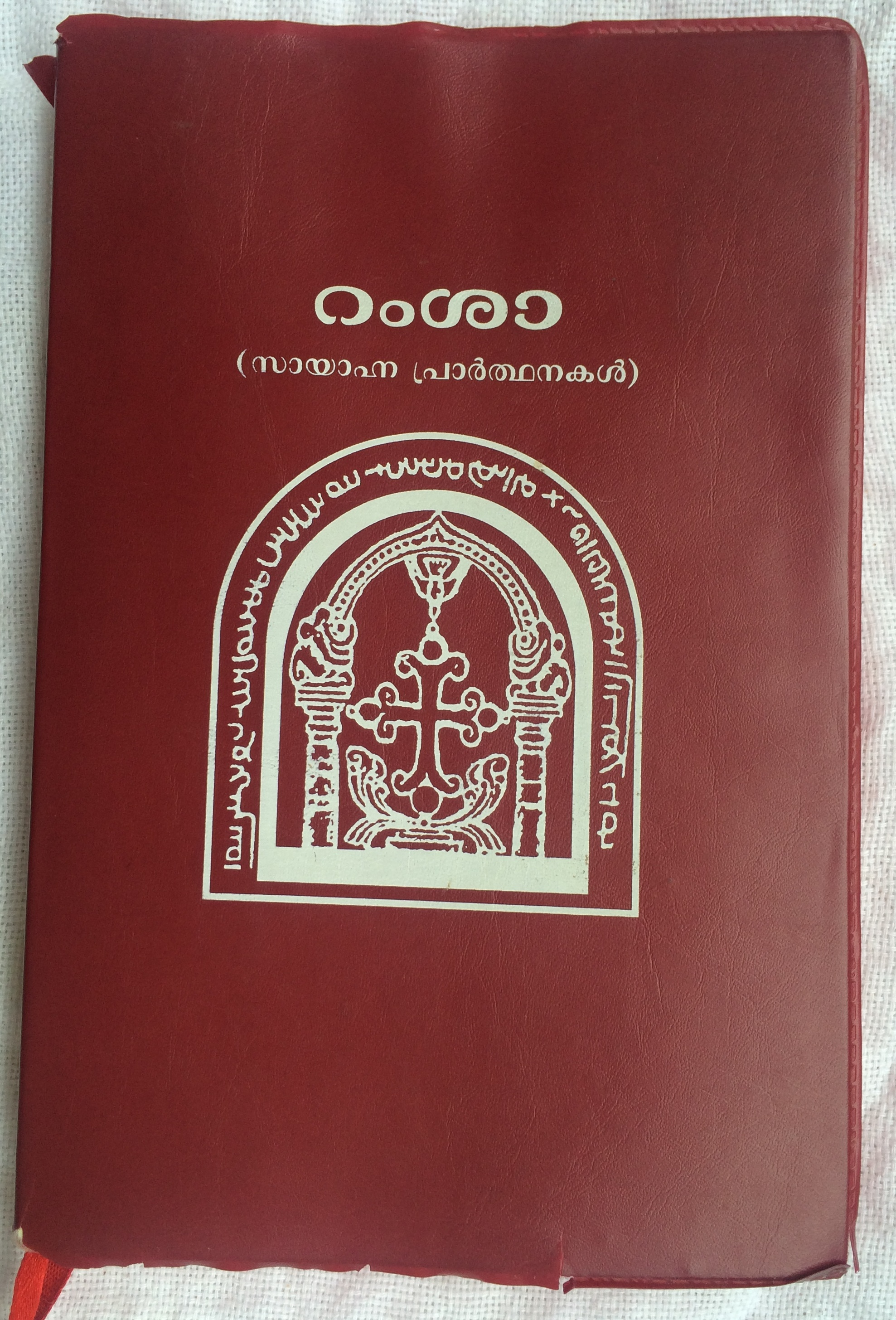
Ramsha prayer book of the Syro-Malabar Church

The Shehima, the Divine Prayers, Divine Office, Liturgy of the Hours, or canonical hours are all regular terms for the liturgy Ramsha is a part of. In accordance with the Jewish tradition, the following are the seven times of prayer in the Syriac Churches:

Canonical hours in East Syriac and English
East Syriac name	English name	Time
Ramsha	Vespers or Evening Liturgy	6 pm
Suba-a	Compline	9 pm
Lelya	Midnight Liturgy	12 am
Qala d Shahra	Vigil Liturgy	3 am
Sapra	Matins/Morning Liturgy	6 am
Quta'a	3rd Hour	9 am
Endana	6th Hour	12 pm

== See also ==
- Saint Thomas Christians
- Shehimo
