= Irresistible force paradox =

What happens when an irresistible force meets an immovable object?

The irresistible force paradox (also unstoppable force paradox or shield and spear paradox) is a classic paradox formulated as "What happens when an unstoppable force meets an immovable object?" The immovable object and the unstoppable force are both implicitly assumed to be indestructible, or else the question would have a trivial resolution. Furthermore, it is assumed that they are two entities.

The paradox arises because it rests on two incompatible premises—that there can exist simultaneously such things as unstoppable forces and immovable objects.

== Origins ==
An example of this paradox in eastern thought can be found in the origin of the Chinese word for contradiction (Chinese: 矛盾; pinyin: máodùn; lit. 'spear-shield'). This term originates from a story (see Kanbun § Example) in the 3rd century BC philosophical book Han Feizi. In the story, a man trying to sell a spear and a shield claimed that his spear could pierce any shield, and then claimed that his shield was unpierceable. Then, asked about what would happen if he were to take his spear to strike his shield, the seller could not answer. This led to the idiom of "zìxīang máodùn" (自相矛盾, "from each-other spear shield"), or "self-contradictory".

Another ancient and mythological example illustrating this theme can be found in the story of the Teumessian fox, which can never be caught, and the hound Laelaps, which never misses what it hunts. Realizing the paradox, Zeus, Lord of the Sky, turns both creatures into static constellations.

== Applications ==
The problems associated with this paradox can be applied to any other conflict between two abstractly defined extremes that are opposite.

One of the answers generated by seeming paradoxes like these is that there is no contradiction – that there is not a false dilemma. Christopher Kaczor suggested that the need to change indicates a lack of power rather than the possession thereof, and as such a person who was omniscient would never need to change their mind – not changing the future would be consistent with omniscience rather than contradicting it.

== See also ==
- Newton's Flaming Laser Sword
- Omnipotence paradox
- On Contradiction
