= Shehimo =

Book

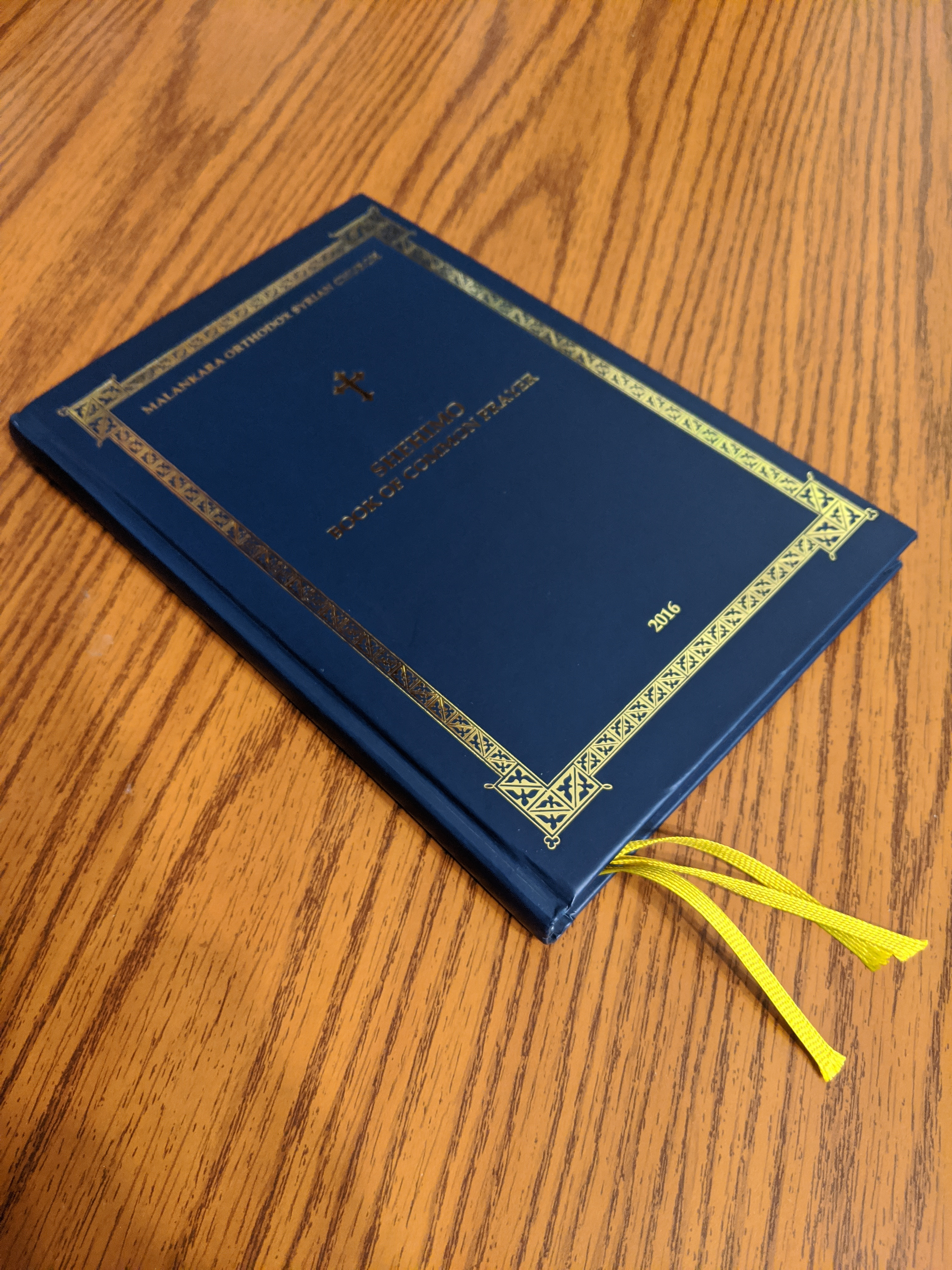
A copy of the Shehimo in English according to the usage of the Malankara Orthodox Syrian Church

Shehimo (Syriac: ܫܚܝܡܐ, Malayalam: ഷഹീമോ; English: Book of Common Prayer, also spelled Sh'himo) is the West Syriac Christian breviary of the Syriac Orthodox Church and the West Syriac Saint Thomas Christians of India (Syro-Malankara Catholic Church, Malankara Jacobite Syrian Church, Malankara Orthodox Syrian Church, Marthoma Syrian Church and Thozhiyur Church) that contains the seven canonical hours of prayer. The Shehimo includes Bible readings, hymns and other prescribed prayers from the West Syriac Liturgical system. Within the breviary there are certain prayers that are recited at seven fixed prayer times, while facing the east at home or at church. The Shehimo also provides communal prayers as an introduction to the Holy Qurbono. The practice of praying during the canonical hours has its roots taken from Psalm 119:164, in which the prophet David prays to God seven times a day. The Shehimo breviary can be prayed either by reading or chanting the prose or singing the verses. The different versions of the breviary are available in Syriac, Malayalam, English, among other languages.

== History ==
The Shehimo is considered a treasury of Syriac Christianity, dating back all the way to the 4th century. Traditionally, the early texts were originally in Syriac only but, with the work and translations of the late Mr. C. P. Chandy, the prayers were made available in Malayalam while still preserving the original Syriac meter. In the 1960s, Fr. Bede Griffiths of Kurisumala Ashram translated an English prose version of the Pampakuda edition Shehimo which was the only English Shehimo version existing among the Syrian scholars. This 2016 version of the Shehimo is a versified edition of the two works by a team of theologically trained individuals in America. Baby Varghese writes, "This publication is a first attempt at the English versification stemming from these individuals' love for the Syriac liturgy." There are currently no active attempts at a revision.The Ministry of Liturgical Resource Development (LRD) helps with translations and publications of liturgical books like the Shehimo and Service Book of Holy Qurbono

== Order of Canonical Hours ==
The seven hours of prayers begin the day before with Ramsho (Evening) and end the day of with Tsha' sho'in (9th Hour), following the definition of a day in the Christian Bible (cf. Genesis 1:5).

Canonical hours in Syriac and English
Syriac name	English name	Time
Ramsho (Sloutho dNogah)	Vespers or Evening	6 pm
Soutoro	Compline	9 pm
Lilio	Night Vigil	12 am, more commonly right before Morning
Safro	Matins	6 am
Tloth sho`in	Third Hour (Terce)	9 am
Sheth sho`in	Sixth Hour (Sext)	12 pm
Tsha' sho`in	Ninth Hour (None)	3 pm

== Themes ==
At the beginning of the week, which is Sunday, believers participate in the public celebration of the Holy Qurbono. The Holy Qurbono or divine liturgy remembers the birth, baptism, public ministry, crucifixion, death, resurrection, ascension and second coming of Christ. The overarching theme for Sunday is celebrating the Resurrection of Christ. The themes for the remaining days of the week are as follows.

- Monday and Tuesday – Repentance
- Wednesday – The Theotokos
- Thursday – The Holy Apostles, Saints
- Friday – The Holy Cross, Martyrs, Confessors
- Saturday – The Faithful Departed

== Usage ==
Worshipers pray the Shehimo at seven fixed prayer times every day, corresponding to the number of canonical hours in the breviary. They pray while facing the eastward direction; towards an altar or Iconostasis. This tradition is derived from the book of Psalms 119:164 in the Bible.

The vast majority of the people who use the Shehimo books have learned the songs and prayers of the Shehimo at an early age, from their church life and daily family prayers at home. Before beginning each hour of Shehimo prayers, one must wash their hands and face in order to be clean before and present their best to God; and their shoes are removed in order to acknowledge that one is offering prayer before a holy God. In this Christian tradition, and in many others as well, it is customary for women to wear a head covering or shawl when praying.

The offices used in the Shehimo, with the exception of Sunday and major feast days (Christmas, Easter, etc.) all involve prostrating; prostrations are done [1] thrice during the Qaumo prayer, at the words "Crucified for us, Have mercy on us!", [2] thrice during the recitation of the Nicene Creed at the words "And was incarnate of the Holy Spirit...", "And was crucified for us...", & "And on the third day rose again...", as well as [3] thrice during the Prayer of the Cherubim during "Blessed is the glory of the Lord, from His place forever!"

Members of the Mar Thoma Syrian Church (Reformed Syrians), pray the Shehimo seven times a day, omitting the Hail Mary prayer and intercession to saints, veneratory prayers are regarded optional and said following the recitation of the Qaumo.

Incense is offered by the priest or a bishop (if present) into a censor which is swung by either a priest or deacon. When incense is offered inside of the church, the veil is opened and the altar, icons, relics, church and people are censed. Incense is offered during the Promion, Etro, Gospel and Quqlions. The practice of offering burnt incense comes from the Bible; in Exodus where God instructs Moses to build an altar and burn incense there.

Now you shall make an altar of incense of incorruptible wood. You shall make it a cubit in length and a cubit in width—it shall be square—and two cubits shall be its height. Its horns shall be of one piece with it. You shall overlay its grating, its sides all around, and its horns with pure gold; and you shall make for it a rim of gold all around. Two gold rings you shall make for it under the molded rim on both its sides. You shall place them on its two sides, and they will be holders for the poles with which to bear it. You shall make the poles of incorruptible wood and overlay them with gold. You shall put it before the veil that is before the ark of the testimonies, where I will make Myself known to you. Aaron shall burn on it fine compounded incense every morning; when he tends the lamps, he shall burn incense on it. When Aaron lights the lamps in the evening, he shall burn incense on it, a perpetual incense before the Lord throughout your generations.

— Exodus 30:1–8

During the season of Great Lent in the Christian calendar, forty prostrations are done daily after the completion of 6th Hour (Sheth sho`in).

The Shehimo book is available for purchase on the official LRD website. The book is also accessible online using the free LRD mobile app for the App Store and Google Play Store.

== Structure ==
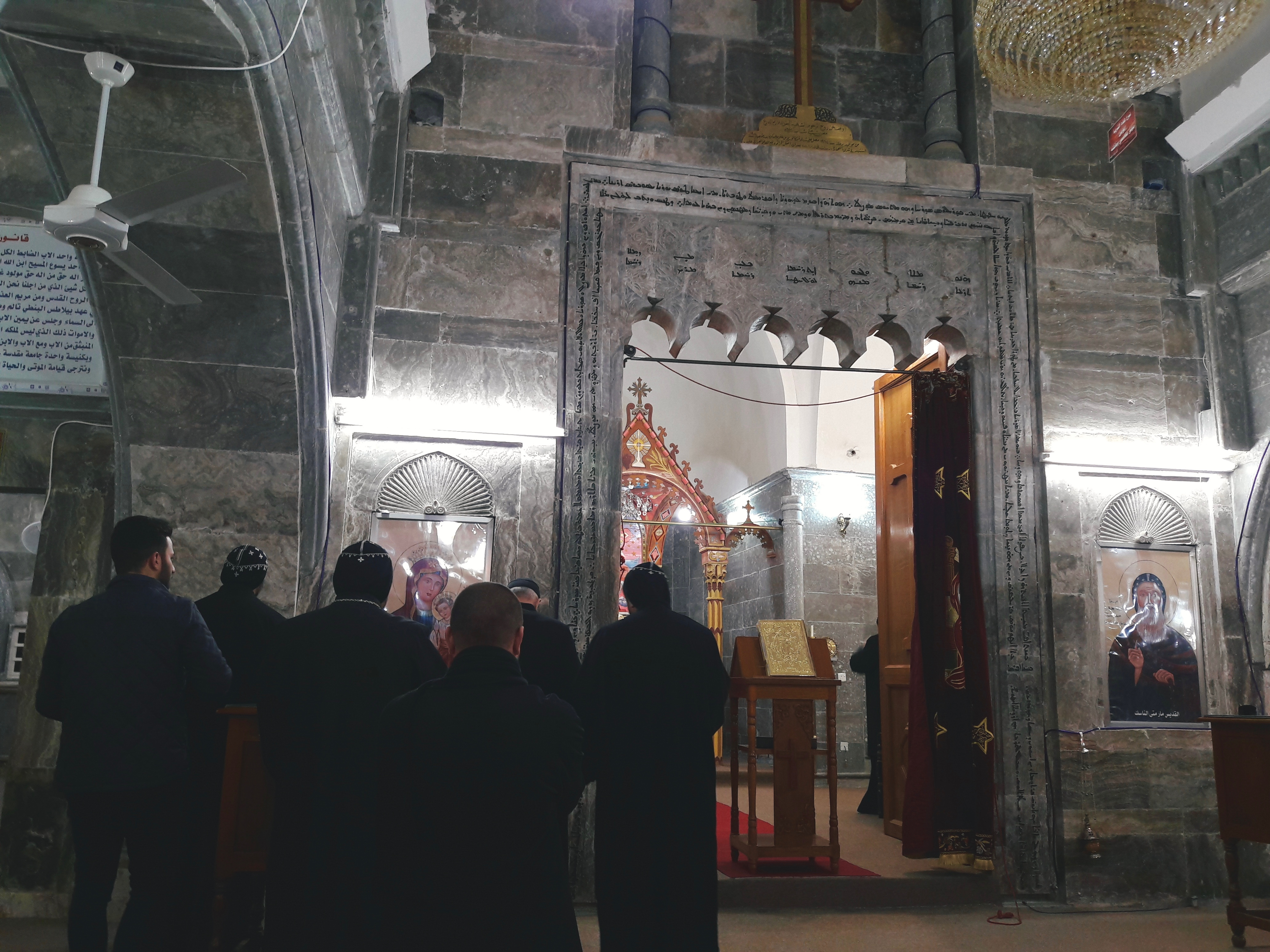
Orthodox monks use the Shehimo prayers throughout their monastic day.

The hours of each day follows a similar theme or pattern. For example, the Soutoro of each day has a theme of repentance. During the Watches of Lilio, the first qaumo commemorates the Mother of God, second qaumo the saints, third qaumo varies on the day, and the fourth qaumo is a general theme. The theme of Tloth sho`in is reflective of the theme of the day. The prayers of Sheth sho`in commemorates the Mother of God, the saints and the faithful departed. The prayers of Tsha' sho`in always commemorates the faithful departed.

Each office or hour begins with the reciting of the Qaumo or Trisagion ("Thrice Holy"). Then followed by that is the Introductory prayer. To end each of the hours of worship there is again a Qaumo with the exception of at the end of Soutoro where the Praise of the Cherubim is used. Additional all of terminal offices ends with the Nicene Creed.

== Eight Modal System ==
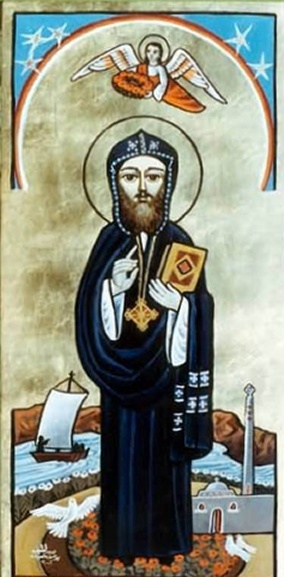
Severus of Antioch, another venerated Orthodox saint, theologian and writer who composed the Ma'nitho of Severus, a doctrinal hymn found in every 6th Hour prayer that affirms the true faith

In the West Syriac Orthodox Tradition, there are originally 8 modes for singing, in Malayalam they are referred to as "Nirams", and in West Syriac as "T'mone Rekne". The 8 modes correspond to the 7 days of the week. This system has fallen out of practice in Malankara in favor of easy to remember and catchy Contemporary Christian melodies. It is uncertain when or where the octoechos originated, but many credit the theologian St. Severios of Antioch. The different days, themes and tones for the fixed hours are included below. (Please note R = Ramsho. S = Soutoro and M = Sapro).

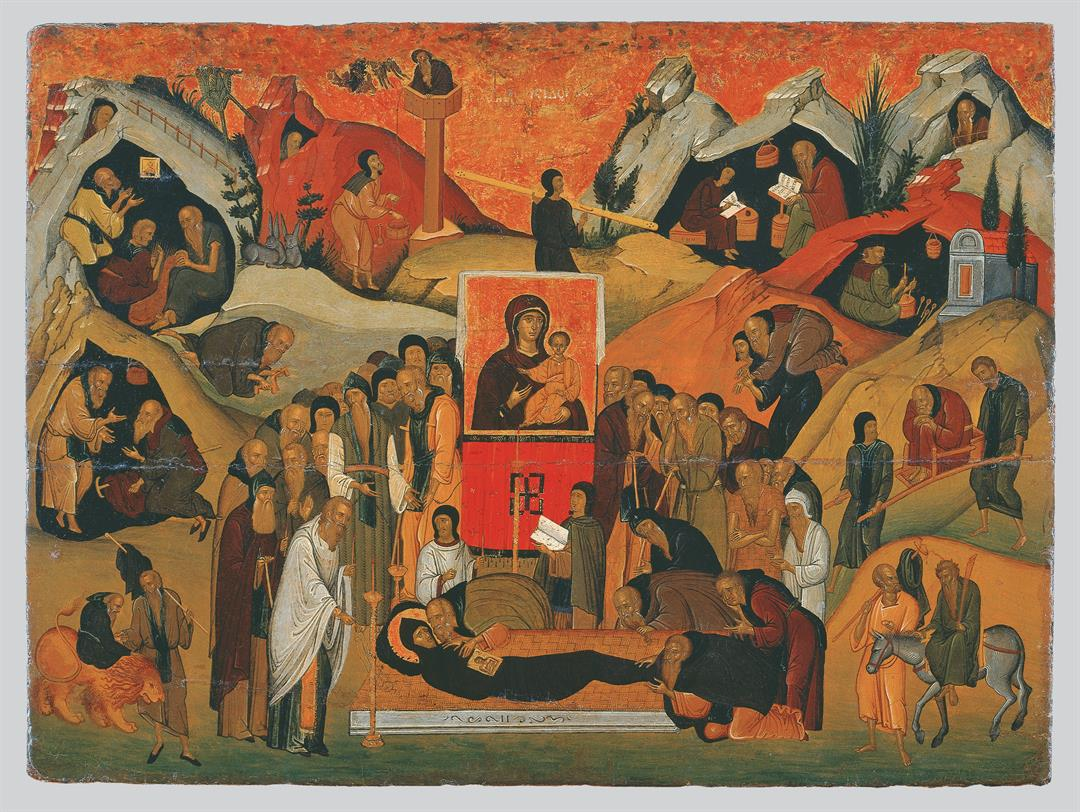
Icon of Saint Ephrem (Mor Ephrem) A venerated Orthodox Saint, Theologian, Hymnographer who is considered the most prolific writer in Syriac Christianity

Fixed Rekne' for Ramsho, Soutoro and Sapro
Day	Theme	Rekno' (R-S-M)
Qyomto (Sunday) - 1	Resurrection	According to Beth Gazo
Monday - 2	Repentance	6 - 6 - 2
Tuesday - 3	Repentance	6 - 6 - 8
Wednesday - 4	Mother of God	7 - 7 - 7
Thursday - 5	Apostles, Martyrs and Doctors	5 - 5 - 1
Friday - 6	Cross	1 - 1 - 6
Saturday - 7	Departed Clergy, Faithful Departed	1 - 1 - 8

The rekne' for each Sunday is found in the Beth Gazo. For the remaining four hours, the "Two Rekne' Per Week" system is followed. When using the two rekne' alternating system, if the week starts with rekno' 1 on the first day (Sunday) it will follow with rekno' 5 on the second day (Monday). The week will continue alternating between rekne' 1 and 5 until the next Sunday. The following week on Sunday, rekno' 2 will be used with rekno' 6 alternating. An 8-week model has been included below. (Please note the system may vary or reset depending on certain feast days occurring during the week.

Two Rekne' Per Week System
Week 1	Week 2	Week 3	Week 4	Week 5	Week 6	Week 7	Week 8
Rekno' 1 Rekno' 5	Rekno' 2 Rekno' 6	Rekno' 3 Rekno' 7	Rekno' 4 Rekno' 8	Rekno' 5 Rekno' 1	Rekno' 6 Rekno' 2	Rekno' 7 Rekno' 3	Rekno' 8 Rekno' 4

It is a custom to seek the intercessions of the Mother of God and all the saints and to pray for the faithful departed while praying the Shehimo. These are done through the Quqlions (Greek) in English they are called "cycles". When sung, all of the Quqlions follow the same structure. The Pethgomo' (word or verse), Eqbo (foot or base), Qolo (song) and Bo'utho (petition). The Quqlions, respected Pethgomo', the Psalm excerpt and general rekno' are listed below. (Please note syr = Syriac. mal = Malayalam. eng = English).

Rekne' for Quqlions
Intercession (General)	Pethgomo'	Psalm	Rekno'
Theotokos (Yoldath Aloho Mariam)	Barth Malko' (syr) Ninnaal sthuthiyodu (mal) The King's daughter (eng)	Ps. 45:9,11	1
Saints (Qadisho)	Zadiqo' (syr) Nayavaan (mal) The righteous (eng)	Ps. 92:12,14	8
Departed Clergy (Kohne')	Kohnaik nleb'shun (syr) Chaarthum neethiye (mal) Your priests (eng)	Ps. 132:9-12	7
Faithful Departed (Anide')	A'k damrahem (syr) Makkalilappan (mal) As a father (eng)	Ps. 103:13,15	8
Holy Cross (Sleebo)	Bok ndaqar (syr) Vellum shathrukkale (mal) Through you (eng)	Ps. 44:5,7	8

== See also ==
- Agpeya
- List of Christian devotional literature
- Syriac Orthodox Church
