= Christian devotional literature =

Category of personal growth writing

Christian devotional literature (also called devotionals or Christian living literature) is religious writing that Christian individuals read for their personal growth and spiritual formation. Such literature often takes the form of Christian daily devotionals.

Original excerpts including the Book of Daniel and Leviticus derive from Ancient Roman (753 BC – 640 AD), Greek and Byzantine (395 AD – 1453 AD) culture – and encompass the past relationship of God's Law through the Old Testament. Though these are the most significant accounts, the majority of the literature comprises commentaries to the ever changing social and political reforms of human history – including the impact of censorship, persecution – the reign of Emperor Nero (54 AD – 68 AD) and Diocletian (284 AD – 305 AD) and martyrdom on Christian life through the ages.

The sources of devotional literature vary across society. Monks, priests and saints such as Agios Paisios (Άγιος Παΐσιος), St. Ephraim and Anthony the Great follow the Western interpretation of holistic commentary, with a focus on aspects of faith such as virtue as both secondary and primary sources; while scholars and philosophers such as Samara Levy (2001) and Christopher Kaczor (2021) break the religio-socio barrier by integrating Eastern, Arabic and international culture and ideologies.

== History and origins ==
=== Old Testament ===
Judea, Galilee and neighboring areas at the time of Hosea, Micah, Isaiah and Samuel's prophetic ministries

The oldest forms of devotional literature were manifested as prophecies, particularly before Christ; and were provided under the dictation of the Holy Spirit as a direct communication of God's "future plans".

The Eastern influence of prophecy becomes apparent through Isaiah and Samuel's literature, deriving from the Judean and Israelian province, supported by Hosea and Micah's ministry in the North Kingdom of Israel and Southwest Judah respectively.

Literacy in Ancient Israel indicates the influence of the Western Semites. Canaanites, however, lacked the complexity of the Egyptian, Babylonian and Assyrian writing systems. This factor increased Israeli literacy rates and allowed large populations to contribute to the amassing prophecies by improving the quantity and quality of public inscription, therefore improving the accessibility of scripture. This is exhibited in findings such as the Arad Ostraca, the Haifa grotto (2nd century AD), and the Broken Seal of Prophet Isaiah (7th century AD), and ultimately contributed to the rapid growth of the Christian doctrine in the Western world.

=== New Testament ===
The turning point occurred within the four canonical gospels (Matthew, Mark, Luke, and John) of the New Testament, where Jesus' ministry drove the theme of Apostolic influence over the Eastern civilisations, subverting the previous doctrine of justice with newfound humility. Contemporary excerpts from Agios Paisios (1994) related the New Testament as "God's will to increase the scope of the Christian, to not stop at justice but look for humility", as a parallel to God's desire to reach non-Christians. For example, Matthew 8:5–13 highlights Jesus's contentment with the Gentiles, "Verily I say unto you, I have not found so great faith, no, not in Israel," as a nod to progression in the spiritual, as well as the progression of the literature.

Further literature was developed under the doctrine of the Ecumenical council: the Nicene Creed (325 AD, First Council of Nicaea), the Apostolic and Athanasian (late fifth to early sixth century AD) Creeds, as well as the Epistolic accounts to the provinces of Rome, Jerusalem and Corinth. Davis (1990), comments on the "growing affiliation with Western civilization" throughout history to highlight the propagation of Christian Literature with globalization; contrasting from the primarily "repetitive" distribution of literature in Eastern provinces such as East-Asia and Ancient Assyria that were a result of anti-religious dictatorship and Christian persecution.

== By denomination ==
=== Eastern Orthodox literature ===
The Seventh Ecumenical Council marked the period of religio-political hostility between the Roman and Byzantine roots of Christianity, embarking many theological and literature-based differences between the two Churches, most prominent being the sacramental use of unleavened bread, as well as the origins and procession of the Holy Spirit (monoprocessionism, filioque) in the Holy Trinity.

==== Monoprocessionism of the Holy Spirit and the Creed ====
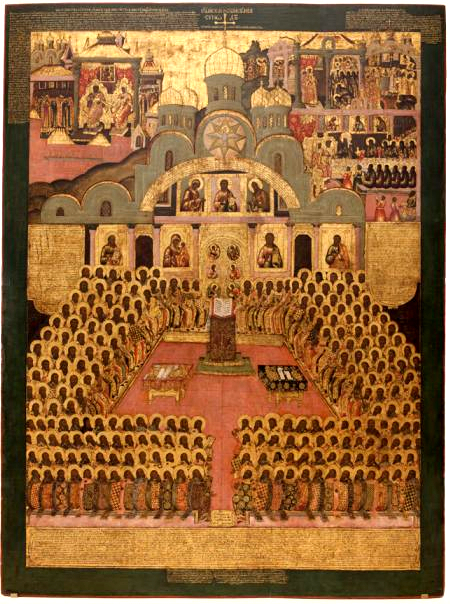
Second Council of Nicaea of 787 AD.

Eastern Orthodox Christians believe in the inspiration of the Holy Spirit as a direct proceeding from the Father as is made clear with literature such as the accounts of the Gospels. This ideology is exhibited in John 15:26, Jesus says of the Holy Spirit: "But when the Helper comes, whom I will send to you from the Father, the Spirit of truth, who proceeds from the Father, he will bear witness about me".

This idea of forbearance is recurrently idealised both throughout Eastern Liturgical and sacramental worship to "enrich the value of the intercessions of the Father" according to the Eastern Theological Teachings.

During the divine liturgy, the line "Father of light, from whom every good gift comes, send your Spirit into our lives..." as well as the Nicene Creed, "begotten of the Father, through Him all things were made..." addresses the centrality of the Father as the Forebear; whilst Western theologians understand the value of the Godhead, "Spirit uncreateth" (Athanasian Creed, 5th century AD) but portray the Trinity as begetters of one-another, "Light from Light, true God from true God".

Eastern Orthodoxy refers to the Nicene Creed (from the First Council of Nicaea also known as the Council of Constantinople, 325 AD) in liturgical writing, affirming the monoprocessional understanding as seen in "who proceedeth from the Father" as widely accepted theologically by the Eastern Orthodox, Catholic, Oriental Orthodox, and Protestant (such as Lutheran and Anglican) churches. However, recent Vatican Councils (1995), argued that including the words καὶ τοῦ Υἱοῦ ('and the Son') would indeed be an act of "heresy of the literature" if used with the Greek word ἐκπορεύομαι (meaning 'out of', 'originating from') as to highlight the relevance of the filioque in Catholic Literature.

==== Iconography ====
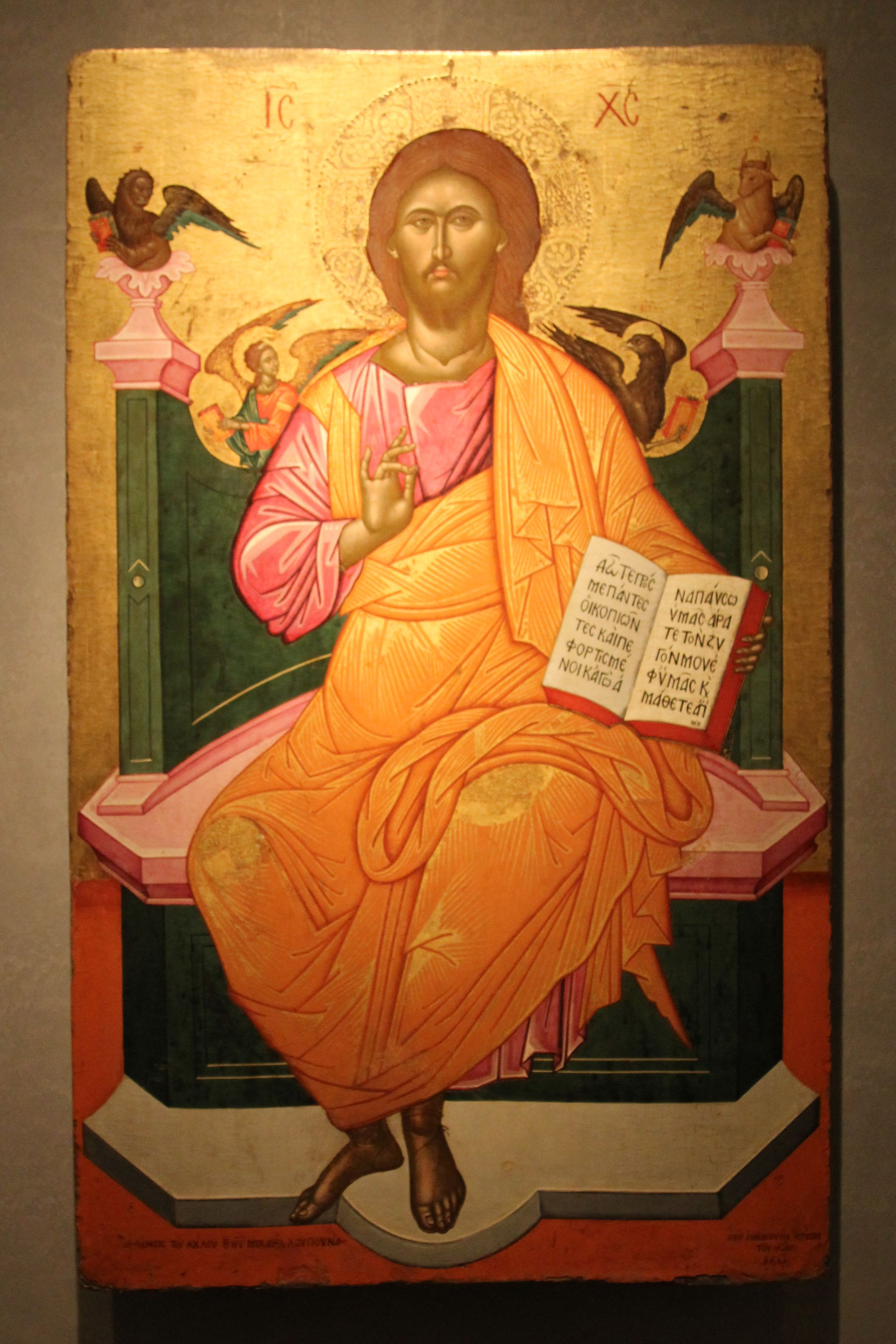
Byzantine Iconography of Christ enthroned with the blessing gesture (1664 AD).

Christian iconography is another theological aspect discussed in literature. Parry (2007), comments on the idea of "reverence rather than worship," for the icons; to affirm its role as a "spiritual reflection" of those worshipped. Furthermore, the canonization of Saints and those depicted in Eastern iconography include the foundational figures of this Church, such as the disciples Mathew, Mark, Luke and John, and prophets such as Elijah and Moses as to reflect the image of God as an aid for spiritual reverence and reflection. Didron (1885) and Weitzmann (1960) comment on the importance of Byzantine art, noting its direct Christian inspiration and motives that characterized Western industrial, and religious use of icons in the Middle Ages. In further history, this increased value of these works due to their scarcity and veneration, benefiting the communal growth and exposure of Christianity throughout Europe, contributing further to a "Christian Boom".

Colossians 1:15, "He is the image of the invisible God" supports the ideology of spiritual inheritance, whereby Christians of the Orthodox Church are born into the spirit, and through reverence, such as with iconography, model the actions of higher spiritual figures to preserve their own spiritual integrity. This is to contrast from paganism, where Ephesians 5:5 states, "he who is covetous (an idolater), has no inheritance in the kingdom of Christ," as to account for the immoral act of "carving your own god," which would displace the teachings of the Trinity, and the Godhead seen in Eastern ministries, therefore rejecting Orthodox teachings.

=== Roman Catholic literature ===
The Roman Catholic Church acts as the sister branch to the East–West Schism of 1054 AD as a split-off from the Eastern Orthodox Church (Koandreas, 2021). Christian literature follows the understanding of the filioque as an element of the Trinity under the ordination of Augustine of Hippo and Thomas Aquinas as is present in the variations of their literature, such as the Nicene and Apostles' Creeds. Furthermore, the presence of a Pope in Catholicism differs from Eastern Orthodox beliefs, indicating a change present in their respective spiritual hierarchies as well as the acceptance of papal infallibility.

==== Filioque, the Holy Spirit and the Catholic Creed ====
Bennet (2018) admits the Catholic Church's "dissociation from the original text of the First Council of Constantinople," which is evident in the addition of the phrase καὶ τοῦ Υἱοῦ' (corresponding to the filioque) as the Catholic Creed differed from the Greek text of the Creed (879 AD–880 AD), even in the liturgical instances (Bennet, 2018). Likewise, the text "We believe..." (Greek: Πιστεύομεν) underwent a later change to "I believe..." (Greek: Πιστεύω) in Catholic, as well as Protestant (such as Lutheran and Anglican) Churches; which highlights the literature as "ultimately an individual confession of belief," but, may undermine the "expression of collective beliefs of the Church".

==== The Pope in Catholicism ====
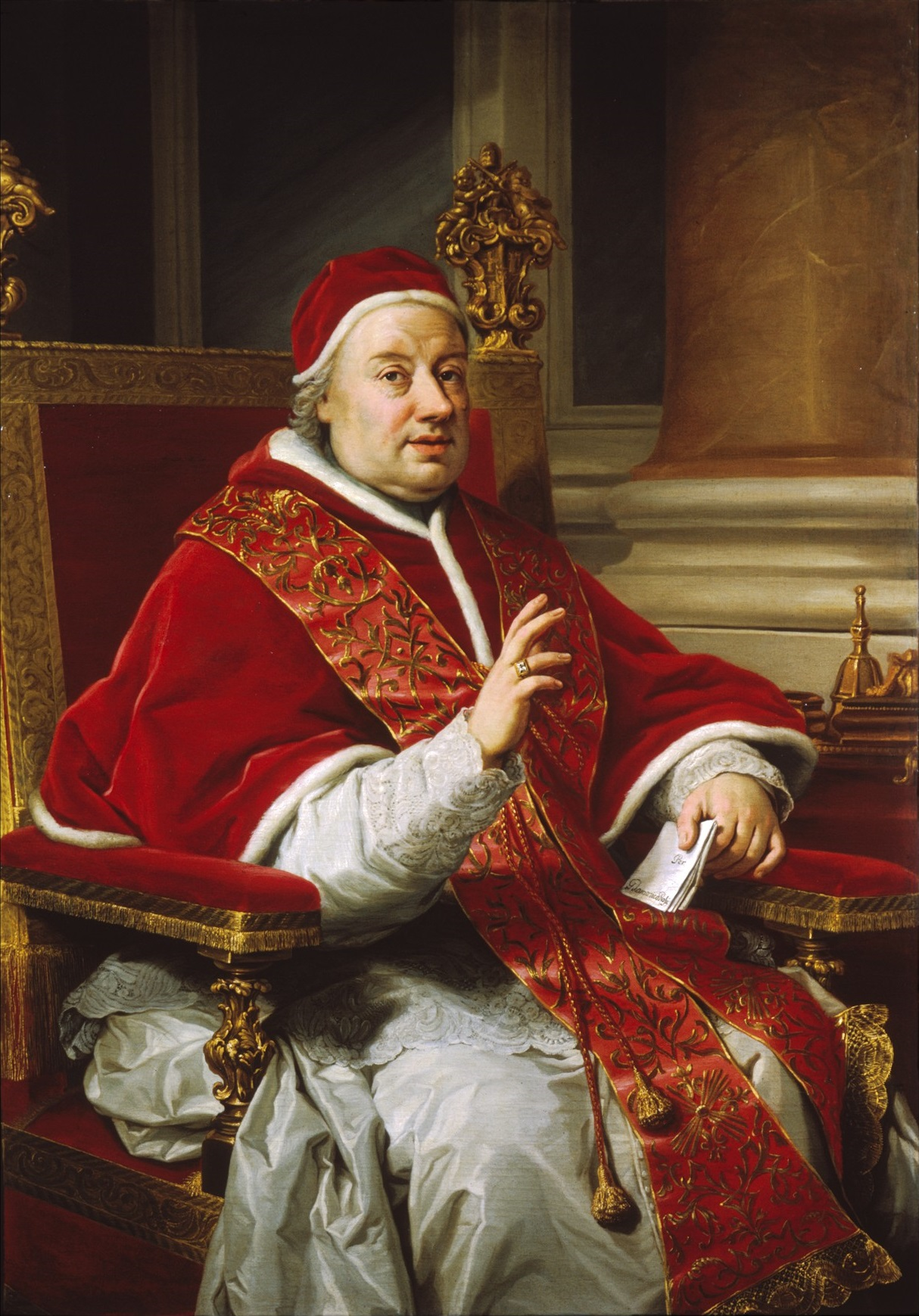
Roman Catholic Pope Clement XIII sitting with the blessing gesture (1758–1769).

The admission of a Pope in Catholic Literature undertakes a position of magisterium (a position of authority in the Roman Catholic Church), whereby spiritual authority and interpretation occurs through him. The role of the Pope is to operate as an infallible example of the religion, meaning he is unable to fall into sin and manifests all matters of the Catholic Doctrine. This differs from the beliefs of the Orthodox, who reject the idea of infallibility, instead accepting that "all humans too are subject to error and sin". This rejection of infallibility originates from the teachings of the Messiah in the fulfillment of Jesus' prophecy, whereby Jesus is the only one to embody the infallibility of a human as he is also part God. This ideology is further exhibited in James 3:2, "If anyone does not stumble in what he says, he is a perfect man," rejecting the infallibility of all humans, extending to those in the Catholic patriarchy.

This highlights the preservation of a spiritual order, which, in Catholicism involves papal and apostolic election as a God-given selection (Holland and Wills, 2015). The earliest accounts of Papal conclave (the gathering of College Cardinals to elect a bishop of Rome) began as early as 1059 AD, aligning with the split of Eastern Orthodoxy after the East-West Schism. Baumgartner (2003) comments on the timing of the split, noting that the Catholic Ministers aimed to uphold a notable figurehead to retain both the integrity and premise of the Church, as well as the ideology of Jesus who himself was infallible.

Similarly, the role of the Pope is also to produce literature. As the magisterium, works of writing such as The Name of God is Mercy (2016) and Walking with Jesus (2015) are widely regarded forms of devotional literature in Catholicism; investigating the roles of virtue, reconciliation, mercy and charitability as measures of achieving sainthood and spiritual closeness with Christ.

=== Lutheran literature ===
In Lutheranism, The Cost of Discipleship is widely read as Christian devotional literature.

Daily devotionals (especially those published for the liturgical seasons of Advent and Lent) are made by Lutheran Hour Ministries for the use of Christians in their sanctification.

=== Anglican literature ===
Many editions of the Book of Common Prayer, the standard Anglican book of prayer and worship, contain regular prayers devoted to worship and spiritual formation, especially in the Daily Office. Additional Anglican devotional works include Holy Living and Holy Dying, both authored by the cleric Jeremy Taylor, and William Law's A Serious Call to a Devout and Holy Life, works which are read by Anglicans for edification. Mere Christianity, a work authored by C. S. Lewis, is popular among Anglicans, and has also come to be considered a spiritual classic by Christians outside the denomination.

=== Methodist literature ===
In Methodism, various authors have written devotional books that are used to help believers grow in grace after the New Birth, including Mottoes of Methodism by Jesse T. Whitley, a daily devotional book. My Utmost for His Highest by Oswald Chambers is widely read in Methodist circles, especially those involved in the holiness movement.

== See also ==
- Breviary
- Daily devotional
- List of Christian devotional literature
