= Compline =

Canonical hour in Christian liturgy

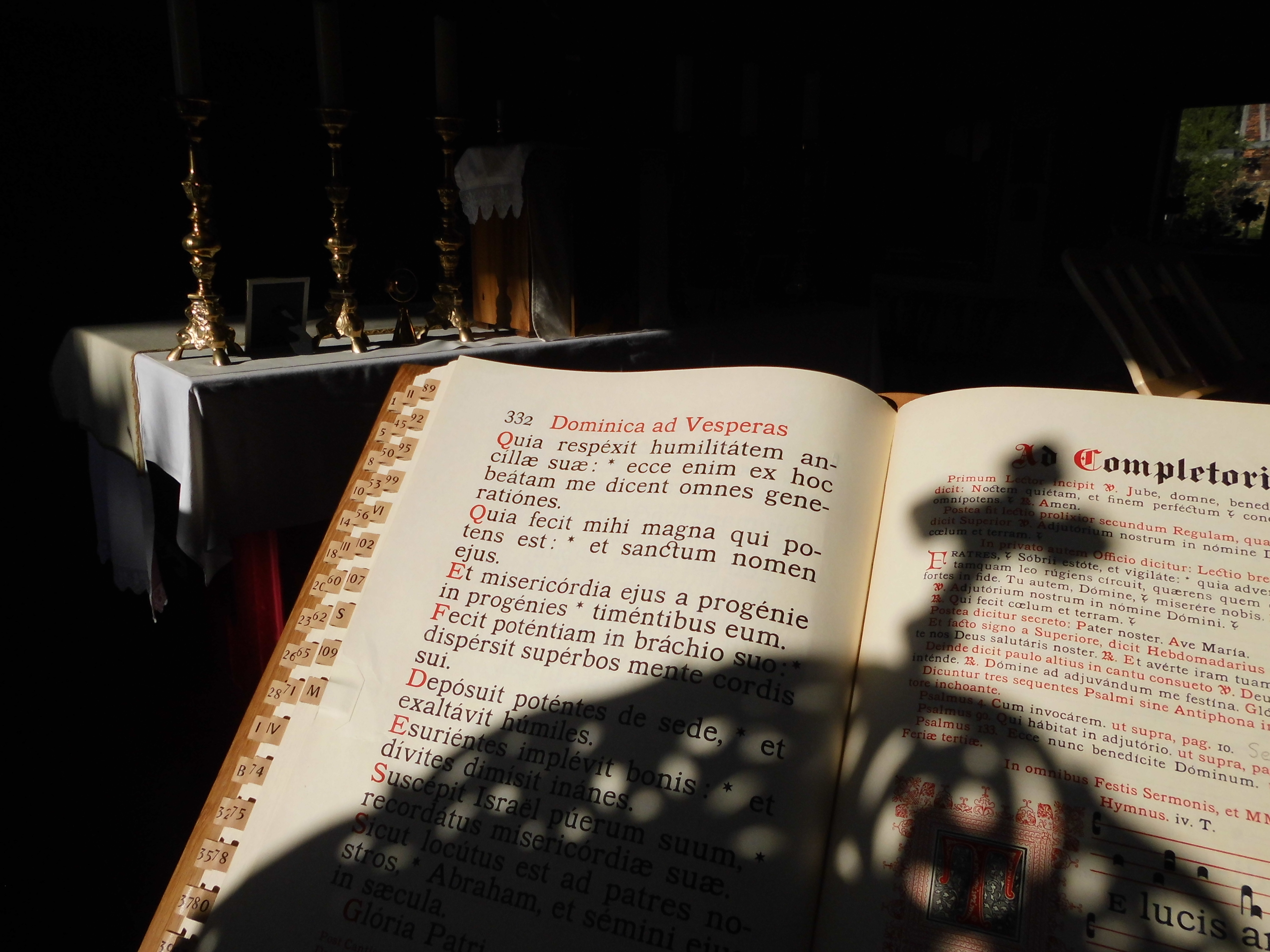
Book of hours open at compline (Eisbergen Monastery in North Rhine-Westphalia, Germany)

Compline (/ˈkɒmplɪn/ KOM-plin), also known as Complin, night prayer, or the prayers at the end of the day, is the final hour or office of the liturgical day in the Christian tradition of the canonical hours.

The English word is derived from the Latin completorium, as compline is the completion of the waking day. The word was first used in this sense about the beginning of the 6th century in the Rule of Saint Benedict (Regula Benedicti; hereafter, RB), in Chapters 16, 17, 18, and 42, and he uses the verb compleo to signify compline: "Omnes ergo in unum positi compleant et exeuntes a completorio nulla sit licentia denuo cuiquam loqui aliquid" ("When then all are in their places, let Compline be said; and after coming out from Compline let no one be at liberty to talk to anyone again") (RB, Chap. 42).

The Compline is a part of Catholic, Anglican, Lutheran, Oriental Orthodox, Eastern Orthodox, and certain other Christian liturgical traditions.

In Western Christianity, Compline tends to be a contemplative office that emphasizes spiritual peace. In most monasteries it is the custom to begin the "Great Silence" after compline, during which the whole community, including guests, observes silence throughout the night until after the Terce the next day. Compline comprises the final office in the Liturgy of the Hours.

== Historical development ==
This section incorporates information from the Catholic Encyclopedia of 1917. References to psalms follow the numbering system of the Septuagint, as said in the Latin of the Vulgate.

From the time of the early Church, the practice of seven fixed prayer times has been taught; in Apostolic Tradition, Hippolytus instructed Christians to pray seven times a day "on rising, at the lighting of the evening lamp, at bedtime, at midnight" and "the third, sixth and ninth hours of the day, being hours associated with Christ's Passion."

The origin of compline has given rise to considerable discussion among liturgists. In the past, general opinion ascribed the origin of this liturgical hour to St. Benedict, at the beginning of the 6th century. But Jules Pargoire and A. Vandepitte trace its source to Saint Basil. Vandepitte states that it was not in Cæsarea in 375, but in his retreat in Pontus (358–362), that Basil established compline, which hour did not exist prior to his time, that is, until shortly after the middle of the 4th century. François Plaine also traced the source of compline back to the 4th century, finding mention of it in a passage in Eusebius and in another in St. Ambrose, and also in John Cassian. These texts bear witness to the private custom of saying a prayer before retiring to rest. If this was not the canonical hour of compline, it was certainly a preliminary step towards it. The same writers reject the opinion of Paulin Ladeuze and Jean-Martial Besse who believe that compline had a place in the Rule of St. Pachomius, which would mean that it originated still earlier in the 4th century.

The Catholic Encyclopedia argues that, if St. Basil instituted and organized the hour of compline for the East, as St. Benedict did for the West, there existed as early as the days of St. Cyprian and Clement of Alexandria the custom of reciting a prayer before sleep, and that this might be taken as the original source of compline.

== Compline in the Roman Rite ==
Responsory of the compline, In manus tuas, Domine

It is generally thought that the Benedictine form of compline is the earliest western order, although some scholars, such as Plaine, have maintained that the hour of compline as found in the Roman Breviary at his time, antedated the Benedictine Office. These debates apart, Benedict's arrangement probably invested the hour of compline with the liturgical character and arrangement which were preserved in the Benedictine Order, and largely adopted by the Roman Church. The original form of the Benedictine Office, lacking even an antiphon for the psalms, is much simpler than its Roman counterpart, resembling more closely the Minor Hours of the day.

Saint Benedict first gave the Office the basic structure by which it has come to be celebrated in the West: three psalms (4, 90, and 133) (Vulgate numbering) said without antiphons, the hymn, the lesson, the versicle Kyrie eleison, the benediction, and the dismissal (RB, Chaps. 17 and 18).

The Roman Office of compline came to be richer and more complex than the simple Benedictine psalmody. A fourth psalm was added, In te Domine speravi (Psalm 30 in Vulgate). And perhaps at a fairly late date was added the solemn introduction of a benediction with a reading (based perhaps on the spiritual reading which, in the Rule of St. Benedict, precedes compline: RB, Chap. 42), and the confession and absolution of faults. This is absent from parallel forms, such as that of Sarum.

The distinctive character and greater solemnity of the Roman form of compline comes from the responsory, In manus tuas, Domine ("Into Thy hands, O Lord"), with the evangelical canticle Nunc Dimittis and its anthem, which is particularly characteristic.

The hour of compline, such as it appeared in the Roman Breviary prior to the Second Vatican Council, may be divided into several parts, viz. the beginning or introduction, the psalmody, with its usual accompaniment of antiphons, the hymn, the capitulum, the response, the Nunc dimittis, the prayer, and the benediction.

By way of liturgical variety, the liturgy of initium noctis may also be studied in the Celtic Liturgy, such as it is read in the Antiphonary of Bangor, its plan being set forth by Warren and by Bishop (see Bibliography, below).

Compline
A service of compline sung by the choir of Trinity Church, Boston in 2016;

Introit: Abendlied by Josef Rheinberger;

Nunc dimittis: Giovanni Pierluigi da Palestrina

In the breviary of 1974 Roman Catholic Liturgy of the Hours, compline is divided as follows: introduction, an optional examination of conscience or penitential rite, a hymn, psalmody with accompanying antiphons, scriptural reading, the responsory, the Canticle of Simeon, concluding prayer, and benediction. The final antiphon to the Blessed Virgin Mary (Salve Regina, etc.) is an essential part of the Office.

== Lutheran usage ==
The office of Compline (along with the other daily offices) is included in the various Lutheran hymnals, books of worship and prayer books, such as the Lutheran Service Book and For All the Saints: A Prayer Book for and by the Church. There was also a very faithful English Gregorian compline made by Carl Bergen and published in 1962 by the Plainchant Society. Carl Bergen wrote organ accompaniment for the whole service. In some Lutheran Churches, compline may be conducted by a layperson with a slight modification to the liturgy. In the Lutheran Service Book, used by the Lutheran Church - Missouri Synod, Compline consists of opening versicles from Psalm 92, confession of sins, psalmody, an office hymn, readings from scripture, responsory, prayer (concluded with the Lord's Prayer), the Nunc Dimittis, and benediction.

== Anglican usage ==
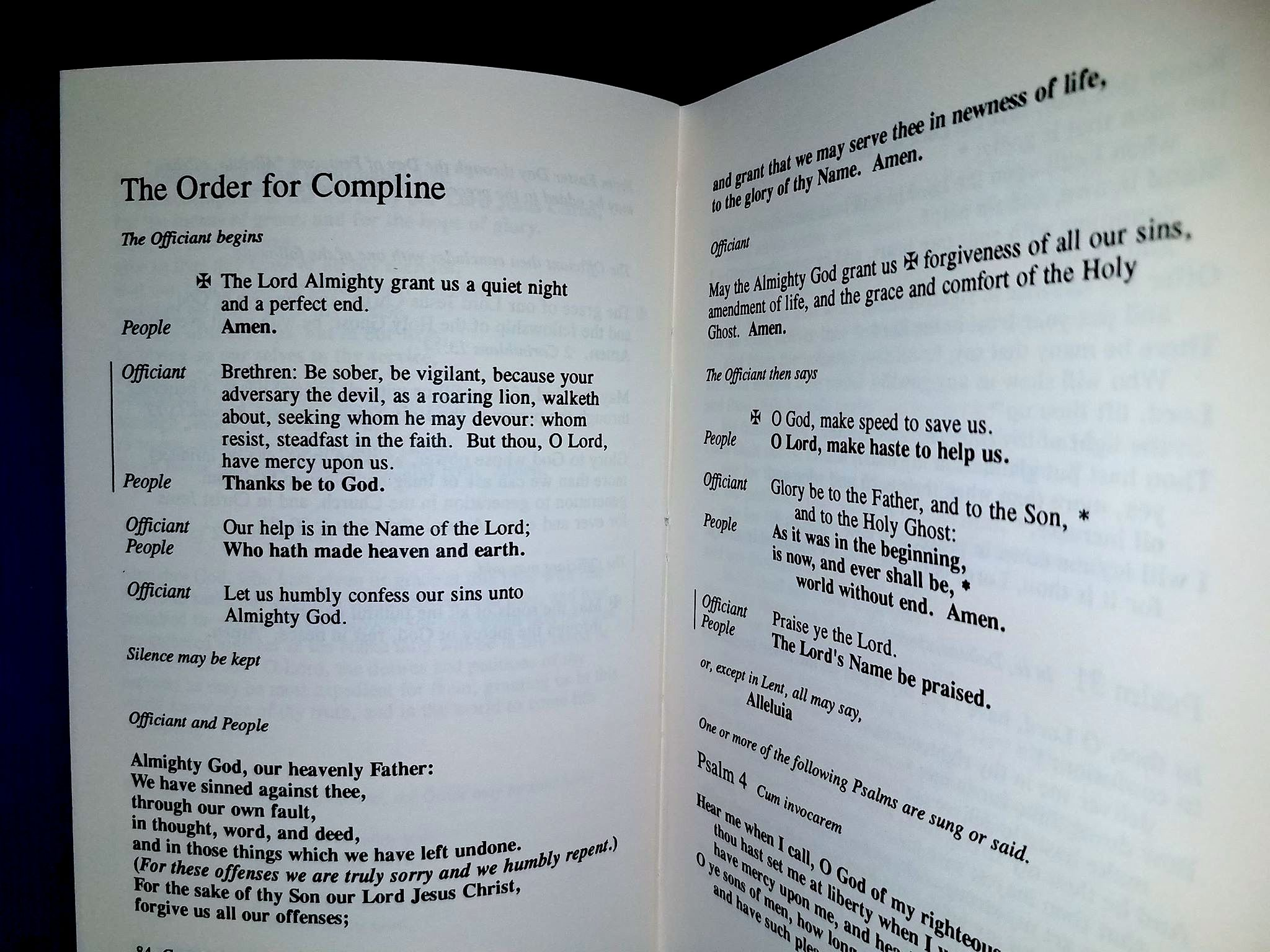
The start of compline in the Anglo-Catholic Anglican Service Book (1991)

In the Anglican tradition, Compline was originally merged with Vespers to form Evening Prayer in the Book of Common Prayer. The United States Episcopal Church's Book of Offices of 1914, the Church of England's 1928 proposed prayer book, the Scottish Episcopal Church's 1929 Scottish Prayer Book, the Anglican Church of Canada's 1959/1962 prayer book, and also the 2004 version of the Book of Common Prayer for the Church of Ireland, along with the 2009 Daily Prayer book of the Church in Wales, restored a form of compline to Anglican worship. Several contemporary liturgical texts, including the American 1979 Book of Common Prayer, the Anglican Church of Canada's Book of Alternative Services, and the Church of England's Common Worship, provide modern forms of the service. A traditional form is provided in the 1991 Anglican Service Book. The Common Worship service consists of the opening sentences, the confession of sins, the psalms and other Bible lessons, the canticle of Simeon, and prayers, including a benediction. There are authorized alternatives for the days of the week and the seasons of the Christian year. As a public service of worship, like Morning Prayer and Evening Prayer, compline may be led by a layperson, quite similar to Lutheran use.

== Compline in Byzantine usage ==
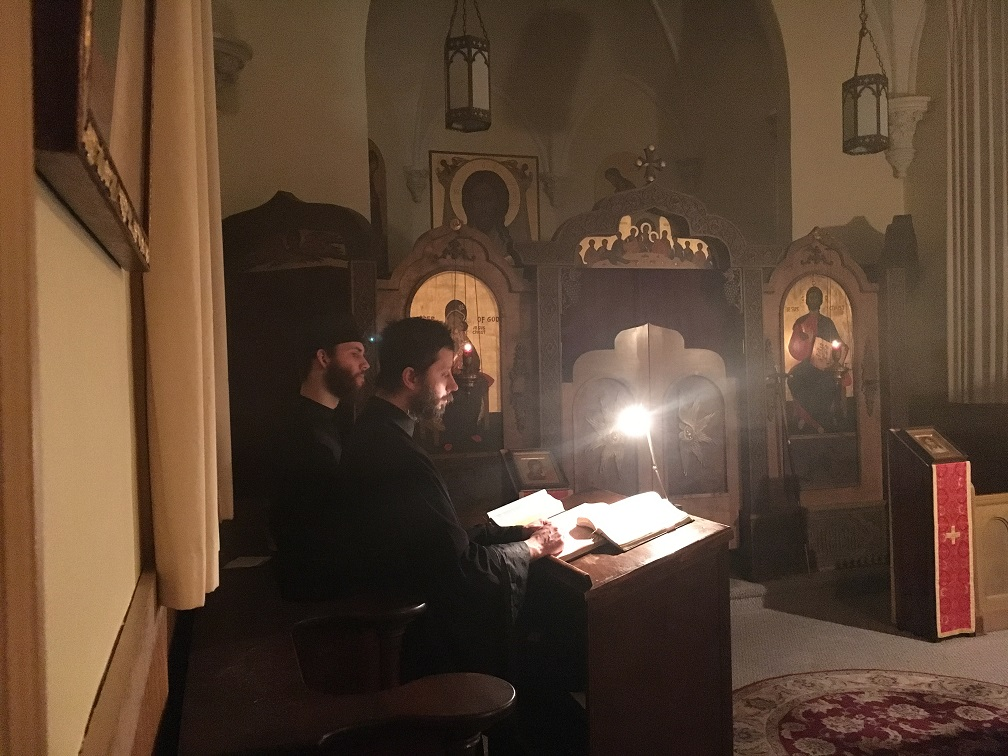
Monks praying compline in St Nazianz, Wisconsin, US

Compline is called literally, the after-supper (Greek (τὸ) Ἀπόδειπνον [apóðipnon], Slavonic повечеріе, Povecheriye), has two distinct forms which are quite different in length Small Compline and Great Compline.

Both forms include a canon, typically those found Octoechos to the Theotokos, although alternative canons are used on certain forefeasts, afterfeasts and days during the Paschaltide. A further exception is on days when the liturgy to the saint(s) of the day is displaced by, e.g., by a newly canonized or locally venerated saint (or icon), the displaced canon is used and after that are inserted the stichera prescribed for vespers.

The Office always ends with a mutual asking of forgiveness. In some traditions, most notably among the Russians, Evening Prayers (i.e., Prayers Before Sleep) are read at the end of compline. It is an ancient custom, practiced on the Holy Mountain and in other monasteries, for everyone present at the end of compline to venerate the relics and icons in the church, and receive the priest's blessing.

=== Small Compline ===
Small compline is prescribed for most nights of the year. It is presided over by a single priest without a deacon.

The liturgy is composed of three Psalms (50, 69, 142), the Small Doxology, the Nicene Creed, the Canon followed by Axion Estin, the Trisagion, Troparia for the day, Kyrie eleison (40 times), the Prayer of the Hours, the Supplicatory Prayer of Paul the Monk, and the Prayer to Jesus Christ of Antiochus the Monk. Following these are the mutual forgiveness and final blessing by the priest and the priest's reciting of a litany.

Before an all-night vigil, compline in the Greek tradition precedes great vespers, being read during the great incensing, while in Russian tradition it simply follows little vespers.

=== Great Compline ===
Great Compline is a penitential daily office which is served on the following occasions:

- Tuesday and Thursday nights of Cheesefare Week, the week proceeding Great Lent
- Monday through Thursday nights of Great Lent
- Friday nights of Great Lent
- Monday and Tuesday of Holy Week
- Monday through Friday during the lesser Lenten seasons: Nativity Fast, Apostles' Fast, and Dormition Fast
- The Eves of certain Great Feasts, as a part of the All-Night Vigil: Nativity, Theophany, and Annunciation.

Unlike Small Compline, Great Compline has portions of the liturgy which are chanted by the Choir and during Lent the Prayer of St. Ephraim is said with prostrations. During the First Week of Great Lent, the Great Canon of Saint Andrew of Crete is divided into four portions and read on Monday through Thursday nights.

Due to the penitential nature of Great Compline, it is not uncommon for the priest to hear Confession during or immediately following the liturgy.

Great Compline is composed of three sections, each beginning with the call to prayer, "O come, let us worship…":

First Part

Psalms 4, 6, and 12; Glory…, etc.; Psalms 24, 30, 90; then the hymn "God is With Us" and troparia, the Creed, the hymn "O Most holy Lady Theotokos", the Trisagion and Troparia of the Day, Kyrie eleison (40 times), "More honorable than the cherubim…" and the Prayer of St. Basil the Great.

Second Part

Psalms 50, 101, and the Prayer of Manasses; the Trisagion, and Troparia of Repentance, Kyrie eleison (40 times), "More honorable than the cherubim…" and the Prayer of St. Mardarius.

Third Part

Psalms 69, 142, and the Small Doxology; then the Canon followed by Axion Estin, the Trisagion, the hymn "O Lord of Hosts, be with us…", Kyrie eleison (40 times), the Prayer of the Hours, "More honorable than the cherubim…", the Prayer of St. Ephraim, Trisagion (this depends on tradition, it is not always recited here), the Supplicatory Prayer of Paul the Monk to the Theotokos, and the Prayer to Jesus Christ of Antiochus the Monk. Then the mutual forgiveness. Instead of the normal final blessing by the priest, all prostrate themselves while the priest reads a special intercessory prayer. Then the litany and the veneration of icons and relics.

== Oriental Christian usages ==
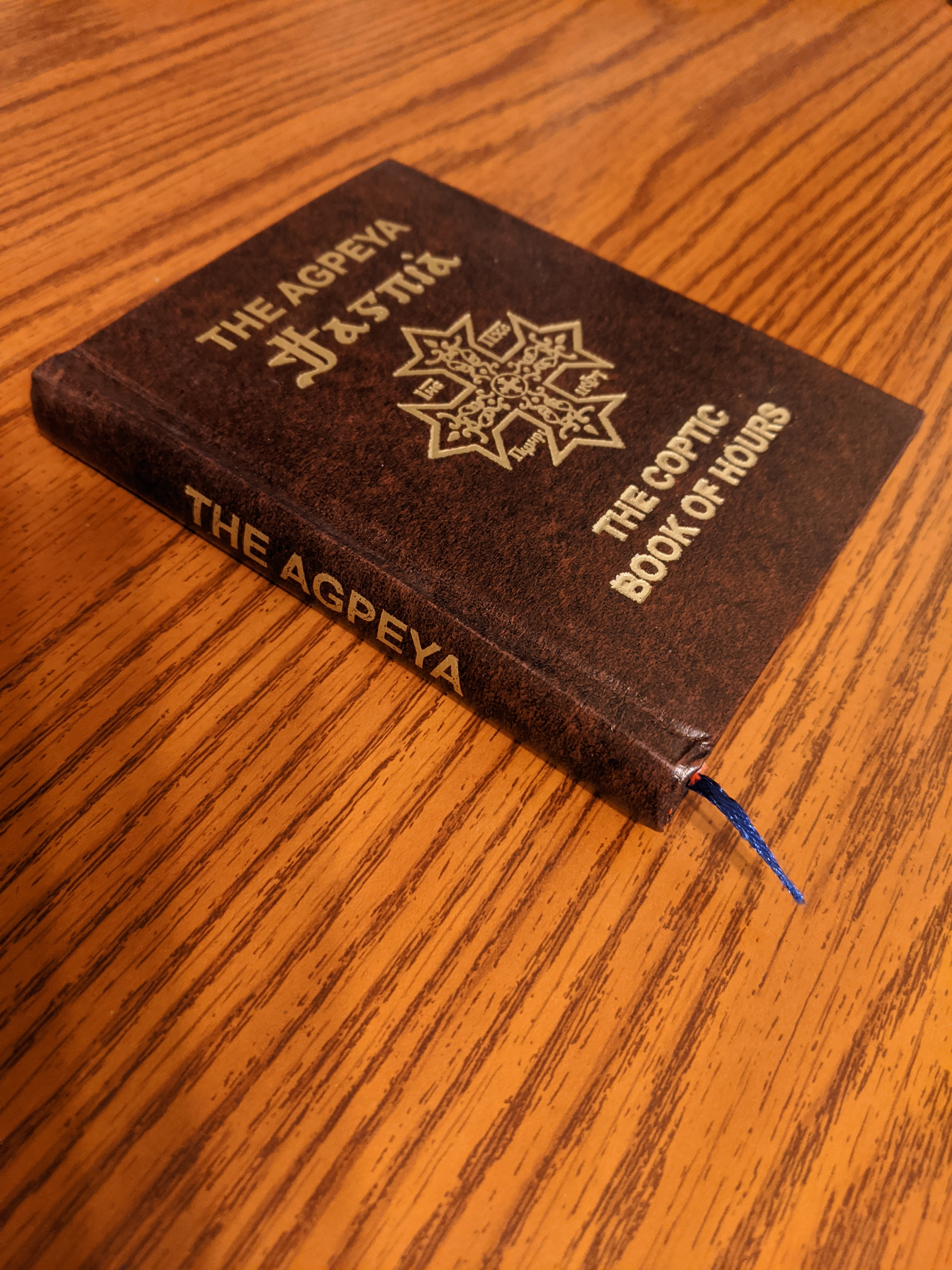
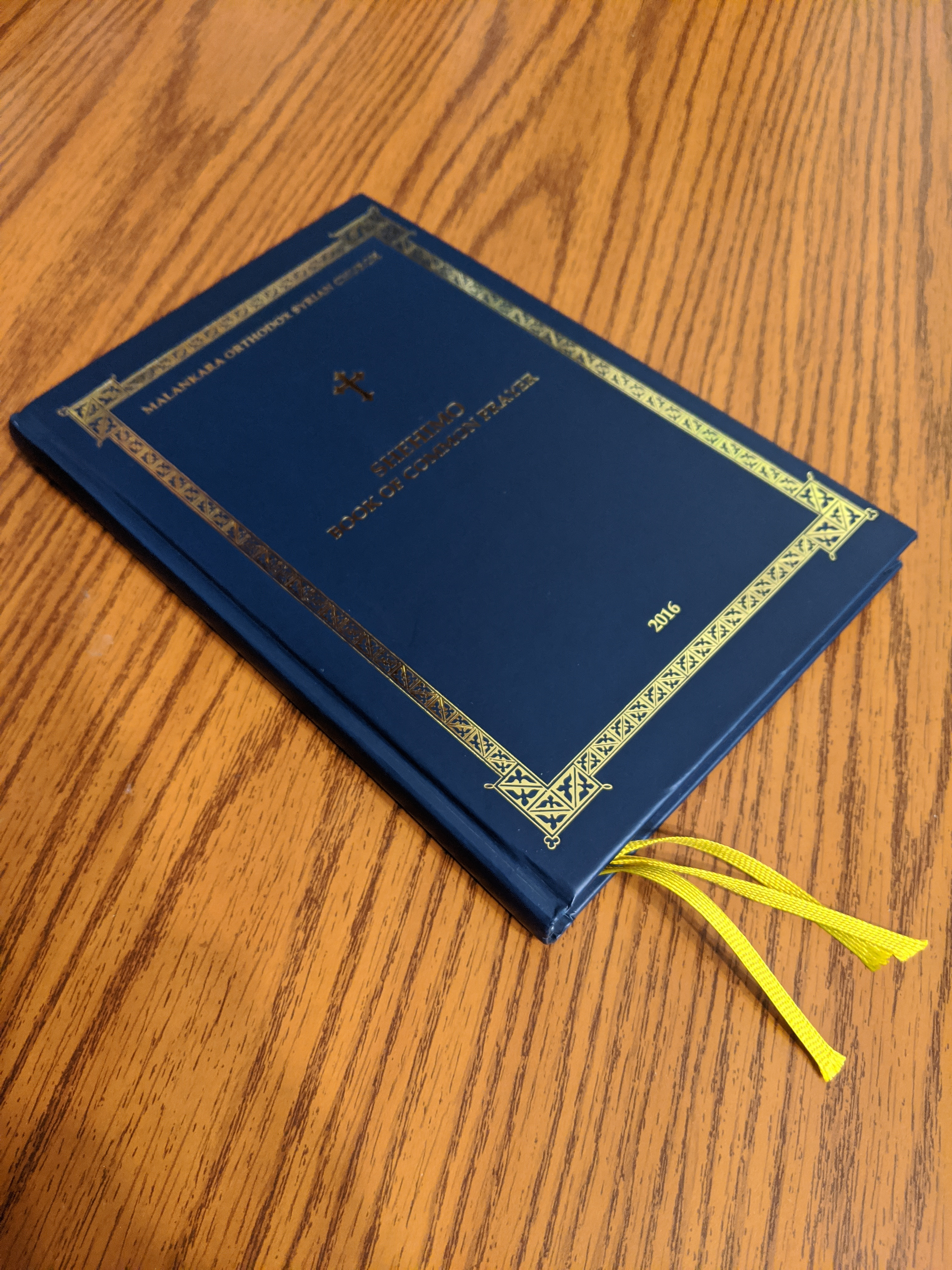
The Agpeya and Shehimo are breviaries used in Oriental Christianity to pray the canonical hours at seven fixed times of the day in the eastward direction.

=== West Syriac Rite ===
In the Syriac Orthodox Church and the other churches that branched from it such as the Malankara Orthodox Syrian Church and the Mar Thoma Syrian Church, the office of Compline is also known as Soutoro and is prayed at 9 pm using the Shehimo breviary.

=== Alexandrian Rite ===
In the Coptic Orthodox Church, an Oriental Orthodox denomination, the Compline is prayed at 9 pm using the Agpeya breviary before retiring.

=== Armenian Liturgy: Hours of Peace and Rest ===
There are two offices in the daily worship of the Armenian Apostolic Church which are recited between sundown and sleep: the Peace Hour and the Rest Hour. These are two distinct liturgies of communal worship. It is the usage in some localities to combine these two liturgies, with abbreviations, into a single liturgy.

==== The Peace Hour ====
The Peace Hour (Armenian: Խաղաղական Ժամ khaghaghakan zham) is the office associated with compline in other Christian liturgies.

In the Armenian Book of Hours, or Zhamagirk`, it is stated that the Peace Hour commemorates the Spirit of God, but also the Word of God, “when he was laid in the tomb and descended into Hades, and brought peace to the spirits.”

Outline of the Peace Hour

If the Song of Steps is recited: "Blessed is our Lord Jesus Christ. Amen. Our Father ... Amen."; Psalm 34:1–7: "I have blessed the Lord at all times (awrhnets`its` zTēr)" ...; "Glory to the Father" (Always with "Now and always ... Amen".; "And again in peace let us pray to the Lord ..."; "Blessing and glory to the Father ... Amen."; Song of Steps: Psalm 120:1–3: "In my distress I cried (I neghout`ean imoum)" ...; "Glory to the Father ..."

If the Song of Steps is not said: "Blessed is our Lord Jesus Christ. Amen. Our father ... Amen"; Psalm 88:1–2 "God of my salvation (Astouats p`kkout`ean imoy)" ...; "Glory to the Father ..."; "And again in peace let us pray to the Lord ..."; "Blessing and glory to the Father ... Amen."; "Peace with all."

In either case the liturgy continues here: Psalms 4, 6, 13, 16, 43, 70, 86:16–17; "Glory to the Father ..."; Song: "Vouchsafe unto us (Shnorhea mez) ..."; "Glory to the Father ..."; Acclamation: "At the approach of darkness (I merdzenal erekoyis) ..."; Proclamation: "And again in peace ... Let us give thanks to the Lord (Gohats`arouk` zTearnē) ..."; Prayer: "Beneficent Lord (Tēr Barerar) ..."; Psalm 27 "The Lord is my light (Tēr loys im) ..."; "Glory to the Father ..."; Song: "Look down with love (Nayats` sirov) ..."; Acclamation: "Lord, do not turn your face (Tēr mi dartzouts`aner) ..."; Proclamation: "And again in peace ... Let us beseech almighty God (Aghach`ests`ouk` zamenakal") ...; Prayer: "Bestowing with grace (Shnorhatou bareats`)" ...

On non-fasting days the liturgy ends here with: "Blessed is our Lord Jesus Christ. Amen. Our father ... Amen".

On fasting days continue here: Psalm 119; "Glory to the Father–"; Hymn: "We entreat you (I k`ez hayts`emk`) ..."

During the Great Fast: Evening Chant (varies); Acclamation: "To the spirits at rest (Hogvovn hangouts`elots`) ..."; Proclamation: "And again in peace ... For the repose of the souls (Vasn hangouts`eal) ...; Lord, have mercy" (thrice); Prayer: "Christ, Son of God (K`ristos Ordi Astoutsoy) ...; Blessed is our Lord Jesus Christ. Amen. Our father ... Amen."

==== The Rest Hour ====
The Rest Hour (Armenian: Հանգստեան Ժամ hangstean zham) is celebrated after the Peace Hour, and is the last of the offices of the day. It may be considered communal worship before sleep. It bears some resemblance in content to compline in the Roman Rite.

In the Armenian Book of Hours it is stated in many manuscripts that the Rest Hour commemorates God the Father, “that he protect us through the protecting arm of the Onlybegotten in the darkness of night.”

Outline of the Rest Hour: "Blessed is our Lord Jesus Christ. Amen. Our Father ... Amen."; Psalm 43:3–5: "Lord, send your light and your truth (Arak`ea Tēr) ..."; "Glory to the Father ...; And again in peace let us pray to the Lord ...; Blessing and glory to the Father ... Amen.;" Psalms 119:41–56, 119:113–120, 119:169–176, 91, 123, 54, Daniel 3:29–34, Luke 2:29–32, Psalms 142:7, 86:16–17, 138:7–8, Luke 1:46–55; "Glory to the Father ..."; Acclamation: "My soul into your hands (Andzn im I tzers k`o) ..."; Proclamation: "And again in peace ... Let us beseech almighty God (Aghach`ests`ouk` zamenakaln) ..."; Prayer: "Lord our God (Tēr Astouats mer) ..."

"Ending:" Psalm 4; Pre-gospel sequence; Gospel: John 12:24ff; "Glory to you, our God"; Proclamation: "By the holy Cross (Sourb khach`ivs ...) ..."; Prayer: "Protect us (Pahpannea zmez) ...; "Blessed is our Lord Jesus Christ. Amen. Our Father ... Amen."

Ending during Fasts: Acclamation: "We fall down before you (Ankanimk` araji k`o) ..."; Meditation Twelve of St. Gregory of Narek; Meditation 94 of St. Gregory of Narek; Meditation 41 of St. Gregory of Narek; Prayer: "In faith I confess (Havatov khostovanim) ..." by St. Nerses the Graceful; Acclamation: "Through your holy spotless and virgin mother (Vasn srbouhvoy) ..."; Proclamation: "Holy Birthgiver of God (Sourb zAstouatsatsinn)"; Prayer: "Accept, Lord (Unkal, Tēr) ..."; "Blessed is our Lord Jesus Christ. Amen. Our Father ... Amen."
