= Teumessian fox =

Mythical animal

Teumessian fox constellation overlayed with an illustration.

teumessian fox

In Greek mythology, the Teumessian fox, sometimes called the Teumessian vixen, was an enormous fox that was destined never to be caught.

== Mythology ==
It was said that the Teumessian fox had been sent by the gods (perhaps Dionysus) to prey upon the children of Thebes as a punishment for a national crime. Creon, then regent of Thebes, set Amphitryon the impossible task of destroying this beast. He discovered a supposedly perfect solution by using the magical dog Laelaps, who was destined to catch everything it chased, to catch the Teumessian fox. Zeus, faced with an inevitable contradiction due to the paradoxical nature of their mutually excluding abilities, turned the two beasts into stone. The pair were cast into the stars and remain as Canis Major (Laelaps) and Canis Minor (Teumessian Fox).

== Naming ==
In reference to Cadmus, the legendary founder of Thebes, the Teumessian fox is referred to by the elegant variation Cadmean vixen in James George Frazer's 1921 translation of Bibliotheca (Pseudo-Apollodorus), though in the Greek texts the sex of the fox was not specified. The terms Cadmeian vixen and Teumessian vixen are used by the Oxford Classical Dictionary (1948) and The New Encyclopædia Britannica (1985).

== Primary sources ==
- Antoninus Liberalis, Metamorphoses 41, with n. 478
- Apollodorus, Bibliotheca 2.4.6
- Corinna (fr. 672 PMG).
- Epigoni (fr. 4 PEG).
- Hyginus, Poeticon astronomicon 2.35
- Ovid, Metamorphoses 7.762
- Pausanias, Description of Greece 9.19.1
- Suda, s.v. Τευμησία

== General and cited references ==
- Antoninus Liberalis, The Metamorphoses of Antoninus Liberalis translated by Francis Celoria (Routledge 1992). Online version at the Topos Text Project.
- Apollodorus, The Library with an English Translation by Sir James George Frazer, F.B.A., F.R.S. in 2 Volumes, Cambridge, MA, Harvard University Press; London, William Heinemann Ltd. 1921. ISBN 0-674-99135-4. Online version at the Perseus Digital Library. Greek text available from the same website.
- Gaius Julius Hyginus, Astronomica from The Myths of Hyginus translated and edited by Mary Grant. University of Kansas Publications in Humanistic Studies. Online version at the Topos Text Project.
- Pausanias, Description of Greece with an English Translation by W.H.S. Jones, Litt.D., and H.A. Ormerod, M.A., in 4 Volumes. Cambridge, MA, Harvard University Press; London, William Heinemann Ltd. 1918. ISBN 0-674-99328-4. Online version at the Perseus Digital Library
- Pausanias, Graeciae Descriptio. 3 vols. Leipzig, Teubner. 1903. Greek text available at the Perseus Digital Library.
- Publius Ovidius Naso, Metamorphoses translated by Brookes More. Boston, Cornhill Publishing Co. 1922. Online version at the Perseus Digital Library.
- Publius Ovidius Naso, Metamorphoses. Hugo Magnus. Gotha (Germany). Friedr. Andr. Perthes. 1892. Latin text available at the Perseus Digital Library.
- Suida, Suda Encyclopedia translated by Ross Scaife, David Whitehead, William Hutton, Catharine Roth, Jennifer Benedict, Gregory Hays, Malcolm Heath Sean M. Redmond, Nicholas Fincher, Patrick Rourke, Elizabeth Vandiver, Raphael Finkel, Frederick Williams, Carl Widstrand, Robert Dyer, Joseph L. Rife, Oliver Phillips and many others. Online version at the Topos Text Project.
