= Laelaps (mythology) =

Greek mythological dog

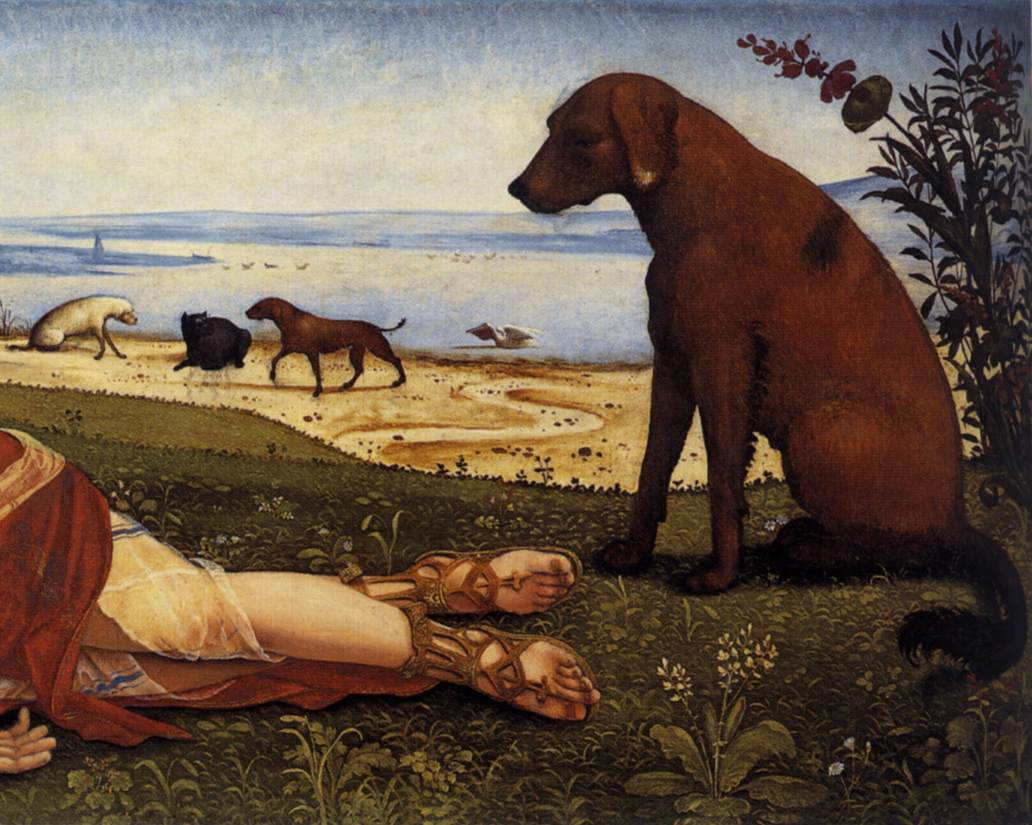
Laelaps, detail from a painting of Procris's death

Laelaps (/ˈli ˌlæps/; Ancient Greek: Λαῖλαψ, gen.: Λαίλαπος meaning "hurricane" or "furious storm") was a Greek mythological dog that never failed to catch what it was hunting.

== Mythology ==
In one version of Laelaps' origin story, it was a gift from Zeus to Europa. The hound was passed down to King Minos, who gave it as a reward to the Athenian princess Procris. She obtained it by sleeping with him, after drugging him with a drink from the Circean root, which came from a plant of the milkweed family. In another version of her story, she received the animal as a gift from the goddess Artemis.

Procris' husband Cephalus decided to use the hound to hunt the Teumessian fox, a fox that could never be caught. This was a paradox: a dog that always caught its prey versus a fox that could never be caught. The chase went on until Zeus, perplexed by their contradictory fates, turned both to stone and cast them into the stars as the constellations Canis Major (Laelaps) and Canis Minor (the Teumessian fox).

== See also ==
- List of dog breeds
