= Fixed prayer times =

Religious practice

Fixed prayer times are common practice in major world religions such as Judaism, Christianity, and Islam.

== Judaism ==
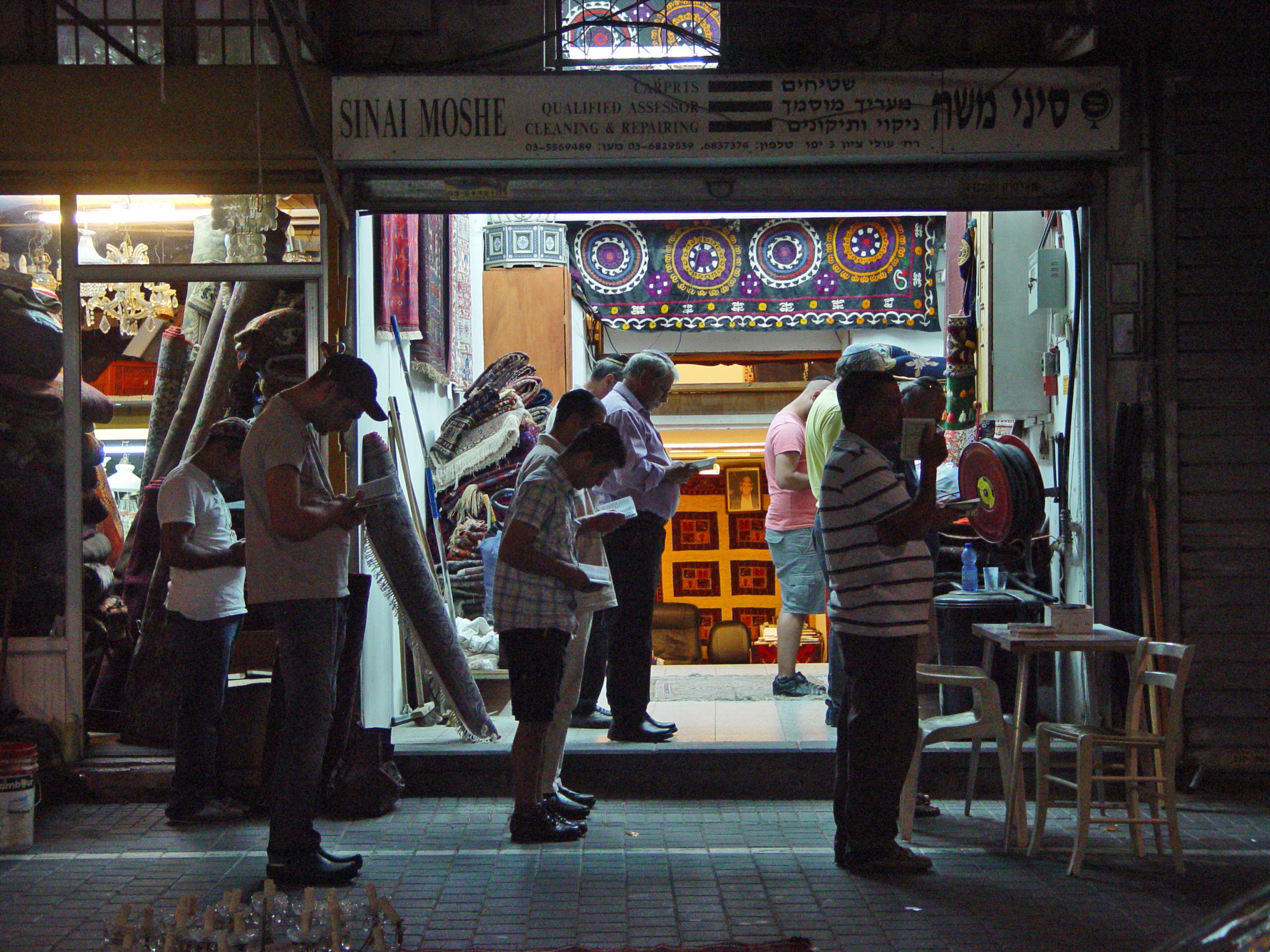
Jews stop to pray Maariv (evening prayer) while at a Tel Aviv flea-market shop

Jewish law requires Jews to pray thrice a day; the morning prayer is known as Shacharit, the afternoon prayer is known as Mincha, and the evening prayer is known as Maariv.

According to Jewish tradition, the prophet Abraham introduced Shacharit, the prophet Isaac introduced Mincha, and the prophet Jacob introduced Maariv. Jews historically prayed in the direction of the Temple in Jerusalem, where the "presence of the transcendent God (shekhinah) [resided] in the Holy of Holies of the Temple". In the Hebrew Bible, it is written that when the prophet Daniel was in Babylon, he "went to his house where he had windows in his upper chamber open to Jerusalem; and he got down upon his knees three times a day and prayed and gave thanks before his God, as he had done previously" (cf. Daniel 6:10). After its destruction, Jews continue to pray facing Jerusalem in hope for the coming of the Messiah whom they await.

== Christianity ==
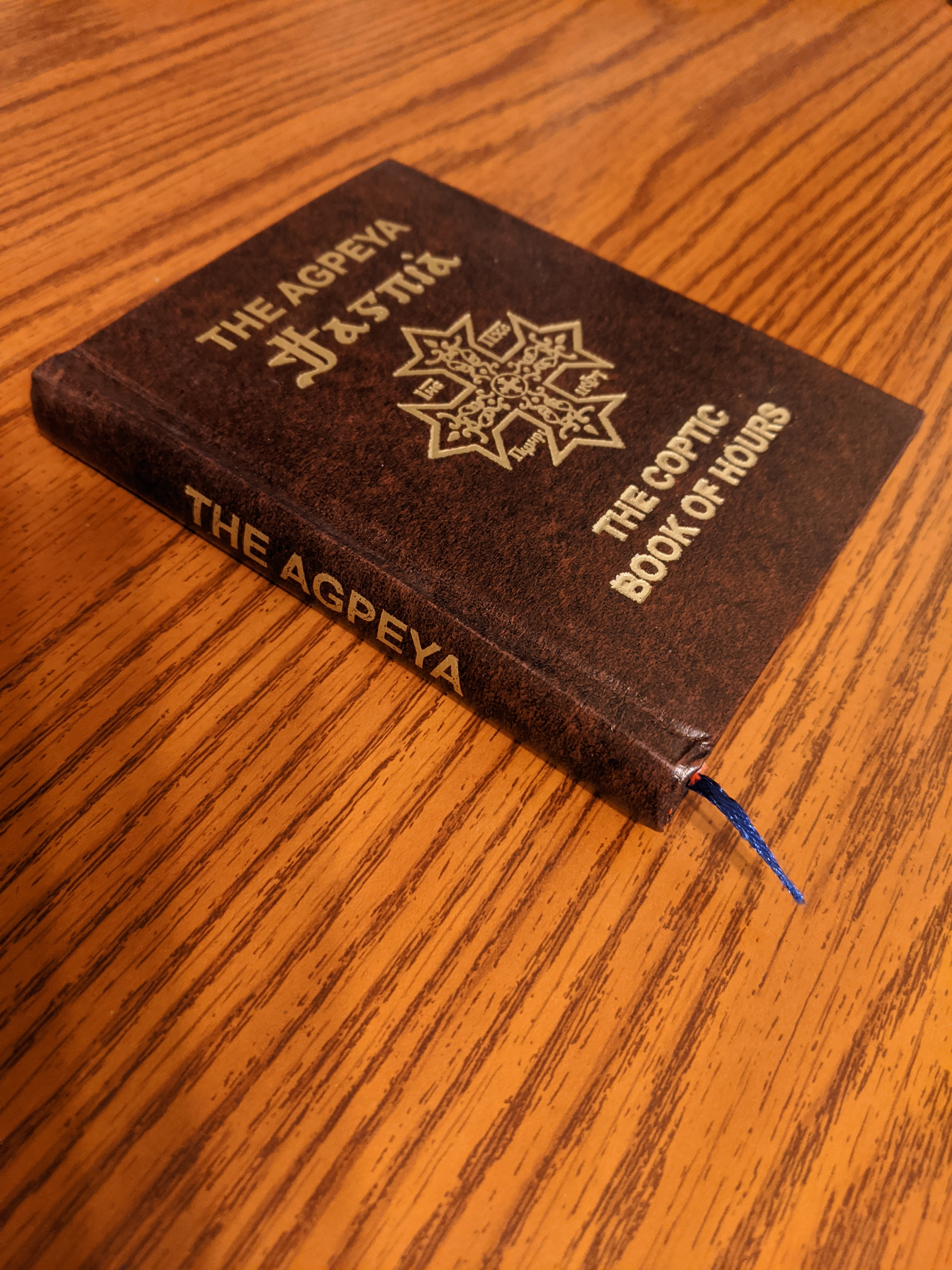
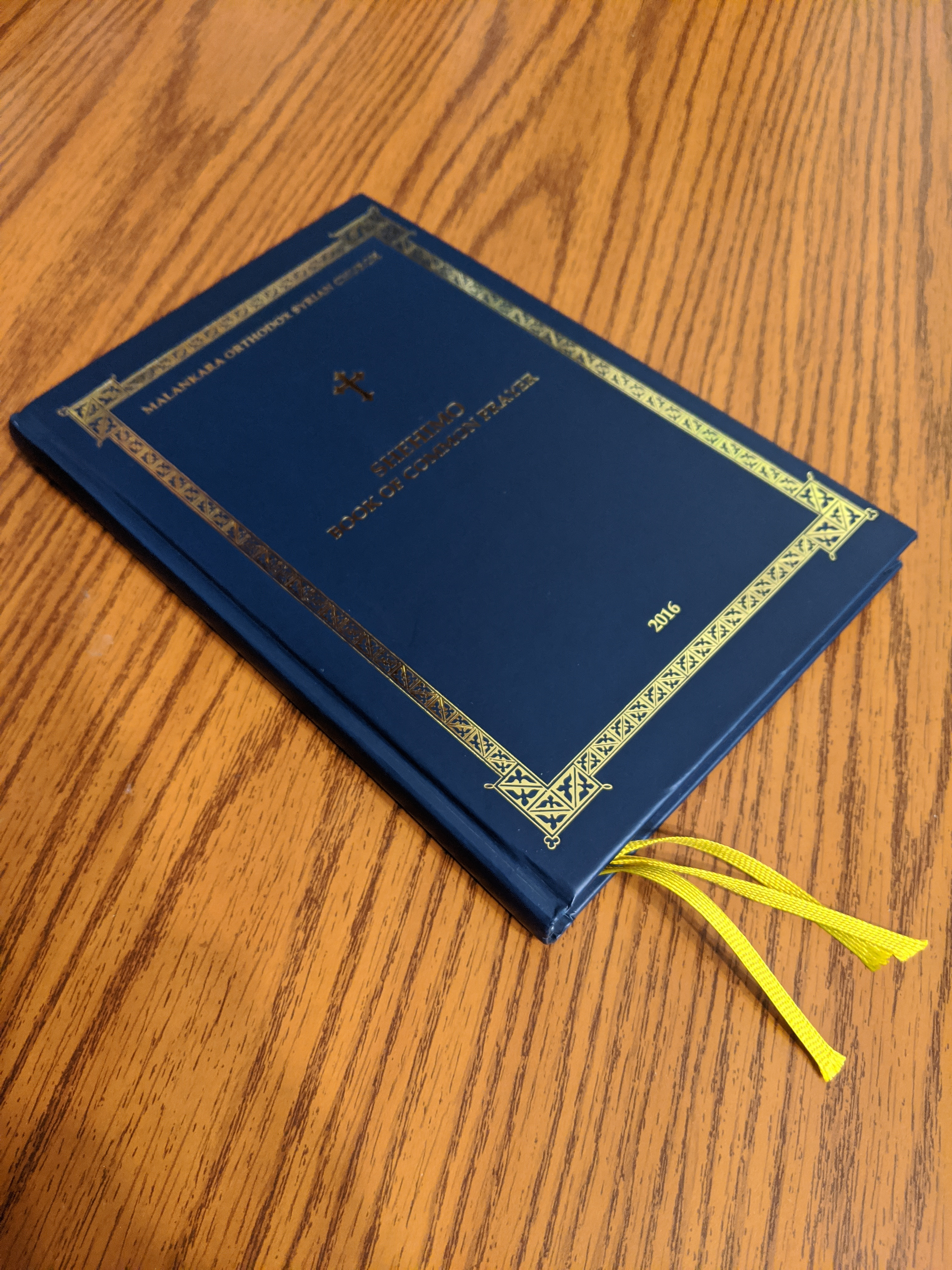
The Agpeya and Shehimo are breviaries used in Oriental Orthodox Christianity to pray the canonical hours at seven fixed times of the day in the eastward direction.

The corporate praying of vespers in the Evangelical-Lutheran tradition, at Vadstena Abbey Church, Sweden

From the time of the early Church, the practice of seven fixed prayer times has been taught, which traces itself to the Prophet David in Psalm 119:164. In Apostolic Tradition, Hippolytus instructed Christians to pray seven times a day, "on rising, at the lighting of the evening lamp, at bedtime, at midnight" and "the third, sixth and ninth hours of the day, being hours associated with Christ's Passion (i.e. 9 a.m., 12 noon., 3 p.m.)."

Christians attended two liturgies on the Lord's Day, worshipping communally in both a morning service and evening service, with the purpose of reading the Scriptures and celebrating the Eucharist. Throughout the rest of the week, Christians assembled at the church every day for "the main hours of prayer"—morning prayer (which became known as Lauds) and evening prayer (which became known as Vespers), while praying at the other fixed prayer times privately (which included praying the Lord's Prayer at 9 a.m., 12 noon and 3 p.m.); monastics came to gather together to corporately pray all of the canonical hours communally. This practice of seven fixed prayer times was done in the bodily positions of prostration and standing, which continues today in some denominations, especially those of Oriental Christianity.

Oriental Orthodox Christians (such as Copts, Armenians, Syriacs and Indians), as well certain Oriental Protestant denominations (such as the Mar Thoma Syrian Church), use a breviary such as the Agpeya and Shehimo to pray the canonical hours seven times a day while facing ad orientem, in anticipation of the Second Coming of Jesus; this Christian practice has its roots in Psalm 119:164, in which the King David prays to God seven times a day. In the Indian Christian and Syriac Christian tradition, these canonical hours are known as Vespers (Ramsho [6 pm]), Compline (Soutoro [9 pm]), Nocturns (Lilio [12 midnight]), Matins (Sapro [6 am]), third-hour prayer (Tloth sho`in [9 am]), sixth-hour prayer (Sheth sho`in [12 noon]), and ninth-hour prayer (Tsha' sho`in [3 pm]). In the Coptic Christian and Ethiopian Christian tradition, these seven canonical hours are known as the First Hour (Prime [6 am]), the Third Hour (Terce [9 am]), the Sixth Hour (Sext [12 noon]), the Ninth Hour (None [3 pm]), the Eleventh Hour (Vespers [6 pm]), the Twelfth Hour (Compline [9 pm]), and the Midnight office [12 midnight]; monastics pray an additional hour known as the Vigil. Church bells are tolled at these hours to enjoin the faithful to prayer. At the very minimum, Orthodox Christians are to pray before meals and thrice daily — in the morning, at noon, and in the evening (cf. Daniel 6:10). Those who are unable to pray the canonical hour of a certain fixed prayer time may recite the Qauma, in the Indian Orthodox tradition. (Note: In the tradition of the Indian Orthodox Church, an Oriental Orthodox denomination, the Qauma can be prayed for those whom are unable to recite the canonical hours contained in the Shehimo breviary; the Qauma is always recited at the start of each canonical hour in the Shehimo.)

In Western Christianity and Eastern Orthodox Christianity, the practice of praying the canonical hours at fixed prayer times became mainly observed by monastics and clergy, though today, the Catholic Church encourages the laity to pray the Liturgy of the Hours and in the Lutheran Churches and Anglican Communion, breviaries such as The Brotherhood Prayer Book and the Anglican Breviary, respectively, are used to pray the Daily Office; the Methodist tradition has emphasized the praying of the canonical hours as an "essential practice" in being a disciple of Jesus, with the Order of Saint Luke, a Methodist religious order, printing The Book of Offices and Services to serve this end. In Anabaptist Christianity, Mennonites (especially Old Order Mennonites and Conservative Mennonites) and Amish have family prayer every morning and evening, which is done kneeling; the Christenpflicht prayer book is used for this purpose. Bible readings may be read after this, often after the evening prayer; to this end, the Tägliches Manna devotional is used by many Anabaptists.

Some traditions have historically placed a cross the eastern wall of their houses, which they face during these seven fixed prayer times. Before praying, Oriental Orthodox Christians and Oriental Protestant Christians wash their hands, face and feet in order to be clean before and present their best to God; shoes are removed in order to acknowledge that one is offering prayer before a holy God. In these Christian denominations, and in many others as well, it is customary for women to wear a headcovering when praying. There exist watches that indicate the seven fixed prayer times.

== Mandaeism ==
In Mandaeism, the daily prayer or brakha consists of a set of prayers recited three times per day. Mandaeans stand facing north while reciting daily prayers. Unlike in Islam and Coptic Orthodox Christianity, prostration is not practiced.

Mandaean priests recite rahma prayers three times every day, while laypeople also recite the Rushuma (signing prayer) and Asut Malkia ("Healing of Kings") daily.

The three prayer times in Mandaeism are:

- dawn (sunrise)
- noontime (the "seventh hour")
- evening (sunset)

== Islam ==
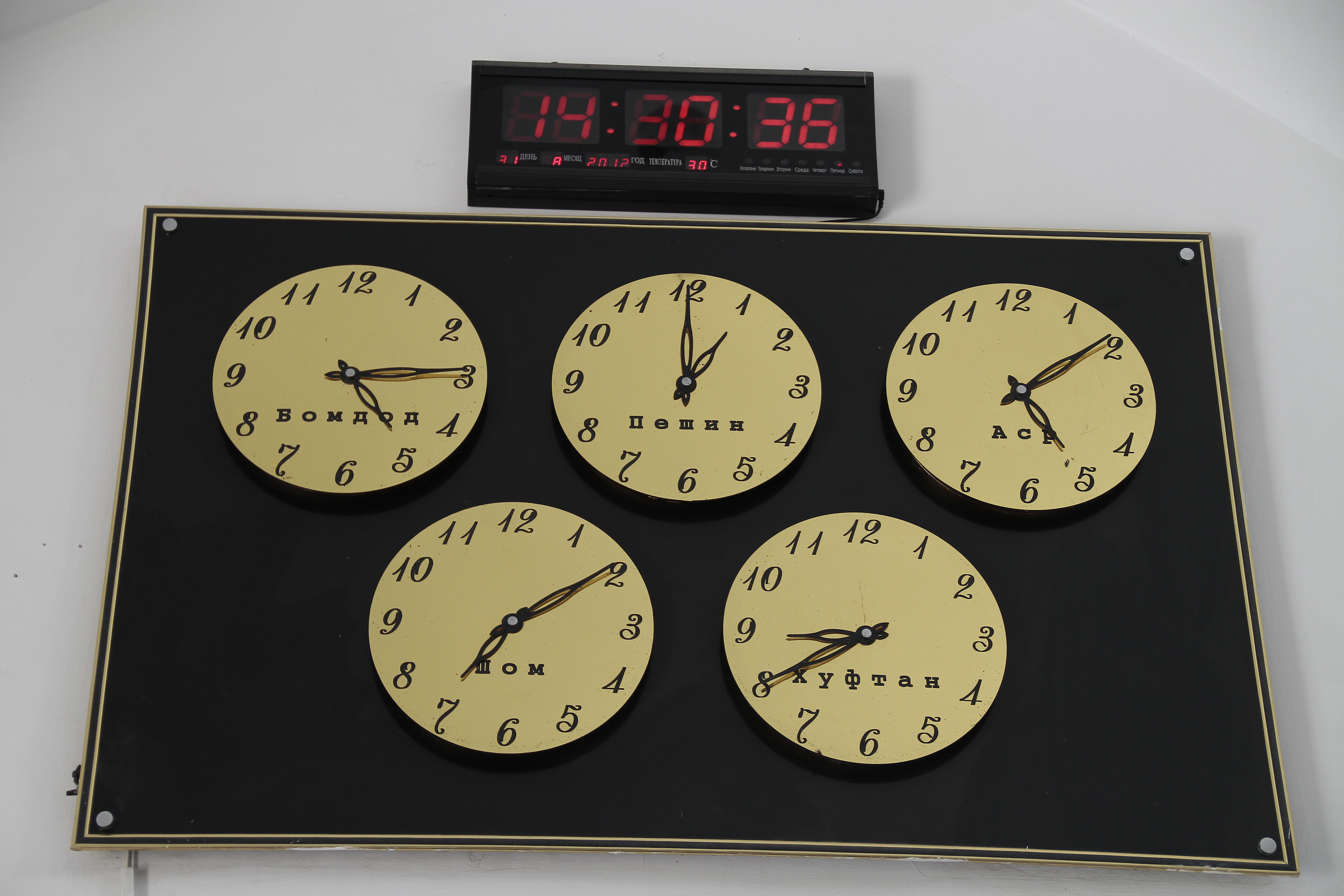
A board with precalculated prayer times in a mosque. Stated in the local time, the Muslim prayer times differ by locations and change from day to day.

Muslims pray five times a day, with their prayers being known as Fajr (dawn), Dhuhr (after midday), Asr (afternoon), Maghrib (sunset), Isha (nighttime), facing towards Mecca. The direction of prayer is called the qibla; the early Muslims initially prayed in the direction of Jerusalem before this was changed to Mecca in 624 CE, about a year after Muhammad's migration to Medina.

The timing of the five prayers are fixed intervals defined by daily astronomical phenomena. For example, the Maghrib prayer can be performed at any time after sunset and before the disappearance of the red twilight from the west. In a mosque, the muezzin broadcasts the call to prayer at the beginning of each interval. Because the start and end times for prayers are related to the solar diurnal motion, they vary throughout the year and depend on the local latitude and longitude when expressed in local time. (Note: For the day-to-day variation of the prayer times, see, for example, a prayer timetable for Banyuasin, Indonesia, for the month of Ramadan in 2012.) In modern times, various religious or scientific agencies in Muslim countries produce annual prayer timetables for each locality, and electronic clocks capable of calculating local prayer times have been created. In the past, some mosques employed astronomers called the muwaqqits who were responsible for regulating the prayer time using mathematical astronomy.

== Baháʼí Faith ==
Followers of the Baháʼí Faith must choose either a short, medium, or long prayer each day to fulfill the requirement of the daily obligatory prayer. Reciting these prayers is considered one of the Baháʼí's most important obligations. The short prayer can only be said between noon and sunset, while the medium prayer must be said three times during the day: once between sunrise and noon, once between noon and sunset, and once in the two hours following sunset. The long prayer is not bound by a fixed prayer time. The text of these prayers is taken from the writings of the religion's founder, Baháʼu'lláh.

== Sikhism ==
Initiated Sikhs are obligated to perform five daily prayers at varying times during the day, from the collection of Nitnem prayers. In the morning, typically right after waking and bathing, the Japji Sahib, Jaap Sahib, and Tav Prasad Savaiye prayers are recited. In the evening, the Sodar Rahras Sahib is recited, and before bed the Kirtan Sohila is recited.

== See also ==
- Buddhist devotion
- Cetiya
- Daily devotional
- Mealtime Prayer
