= Direction of prayer =

Characteristic of some world religions

Prayer in a certain direction is characteristic of many world religions, such as Judaism, Christianity, Islam, and the Bahá'í Faith.

== Judaism ==
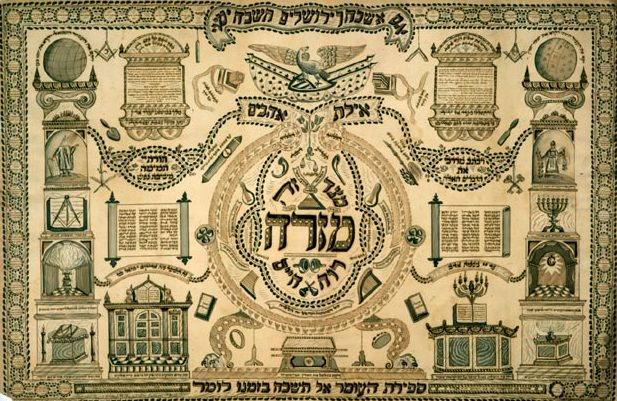
A Mizrah wall hanging; the word Mizrah (Hebrew: מזרח, 'East') appears at the center.

Jews traditionally pray in the direction of Jerusalem, where the presence of the transcendent God (shekinah) [resided] in the Holy of Holies of the Temple. Within the Holy of Holies lay the Ark of the Covenant that contained the Ten Commandments tablets given to the prophet Moses by God; this is the reason that the Temple of Solomon became the focal point for Jewish prayer. In the Bible, it is written that when the prophet Daniel was in Babylon, he "went to his house where he had windows in his upper chamber open to Jerusalem; and he got down upon his knees three times a day and prayed and gave thanks before his God, as he had done previously" (cf. Daniel 6:10). After the destruction of the Temple of Solomon, Jews continue to pray facing Jerusalem in hope for the coming of the Messiah whom they await.

The Talmud (Berakhot 30a) instructs Jews outside the Land of Israel to face the Holy Land while praying; Jews residing in Israel should turn towards the city of Jerusalem; those living within Jerusalem should orient themselves towards the Temple Mount, and those next to the Temple Mount should turn towards the former site of the Holy of Holies. The Shulchan Aruch (Code of Jewish Law) thus specifies that in synagogues, the Ark should be placed such that "worshipers may pray in the direction of the Holy Land and the place of the Sanctuary in Jerusalem". When synagogues are erected, they are built to face Jerusalem.

The Mizrah (literally, 'East') is a plaque or other decorative wall hanging which is placed on the eastern wall of many homes of Jews in the Diaspora to the west of Israel, in order to mark the direction of Jerusalem towards which prayer is focused. A Mizrah plaque is often an artistic, ornate piece, being written in calligraphy and featuring a panorama of Jerusalem. Mizrah wall hangings typically feature the Hebrew word Mizrah (Hebrew: מזרח), and may include the verse from the Torah which states, "From the rising of the sun unto its going down, the Lord's name is to be praised" (cf. Psalm 113:3).

== Christianity ==
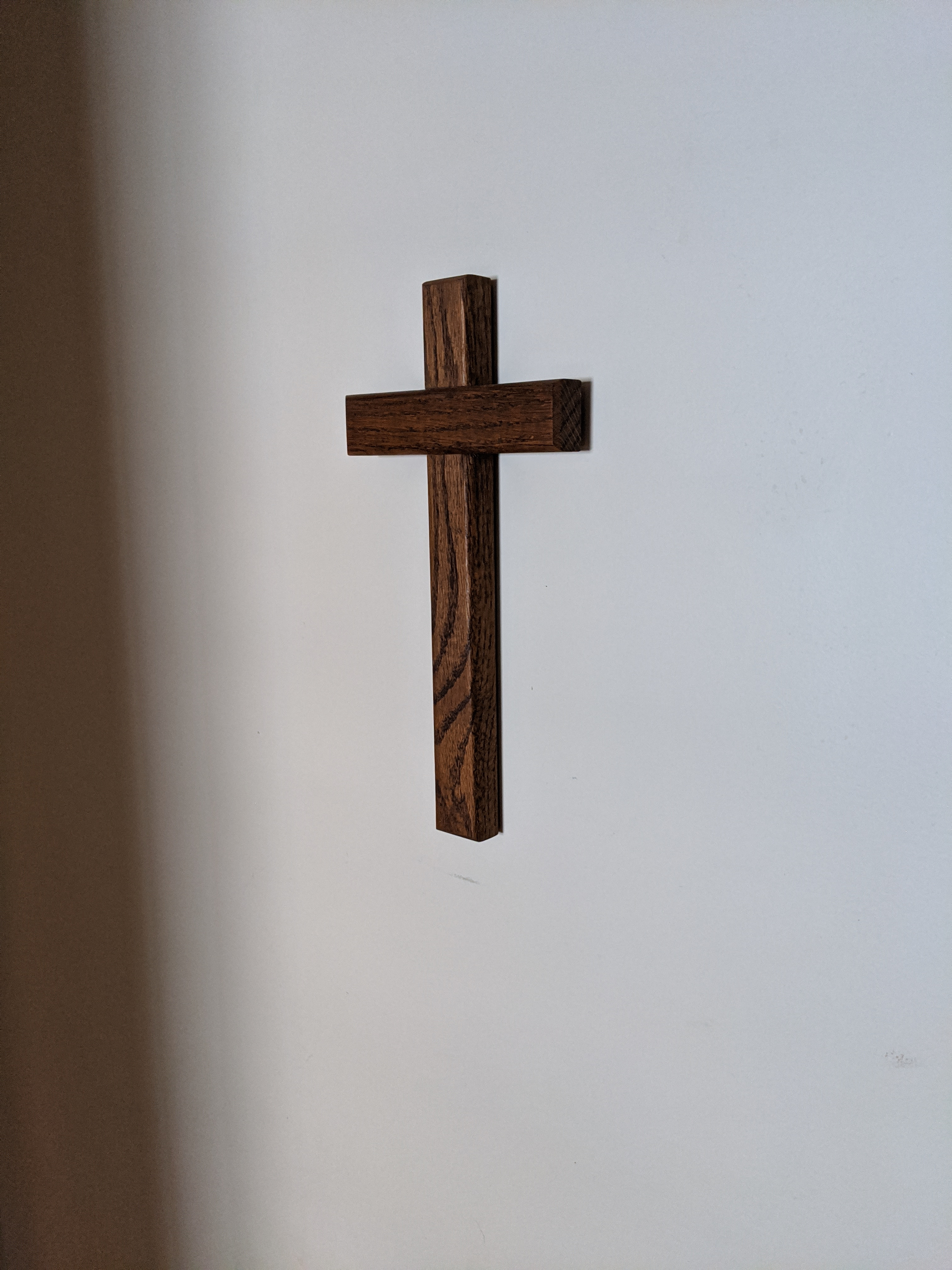
Throughout history, believers hung a Christian cross on the eastern wall of their homes to indicate the eastward direction towards which they focused their prayers.

Since the time of the early Church, the eastward direction of Christian prayer has carried a strong significance, attested by the writings of the Church Fathers. In the 2nd century, Syrian Christians hung a Christian cross on the eastern wall of their house, symbolizing "their souls facing God, talking with him, and sharing their spirituality with the Lord." Two centuries later, Saint Basil the Great declared that one of the unwritten commandments of the Church was to pray facing east. Nearly all Christian apologetic tracts published in the 7th century AD in the Syriac and Arabic languages explicated that the reason that Christians prayed facing the east is because "the Garden of Eden was planted in the east (Genesis 2:8) and that at the end of time, at the second coming, the Messiah would approach Jerusalem from the east."

Throughout Christendom, believers have hung or painted a Christian cross, to which they prostrated in front of, on the eastern wall of their home in order to indicate the eastward direction of prayer, as an "expression of their undying belief in the coming again of Jesus was united to their conviction that the cross, 'the sign of the Son of Man,' would appear in the eastern heavens on his return (see Matthew 24:30)." Communicants in the Oriental Orthodox Churches today (such as those of the Coptic Orthodox Church and Indian Orthodox Church), and those of the Mar Thoma Syrian Church (an Oriental Protestant denomination) pray the canonical hours contained in the Agpeya and Shehimo breviaries, respectively (a practice done at seven fixed prayer times a day) facing the eastward direction.

== Islam ==
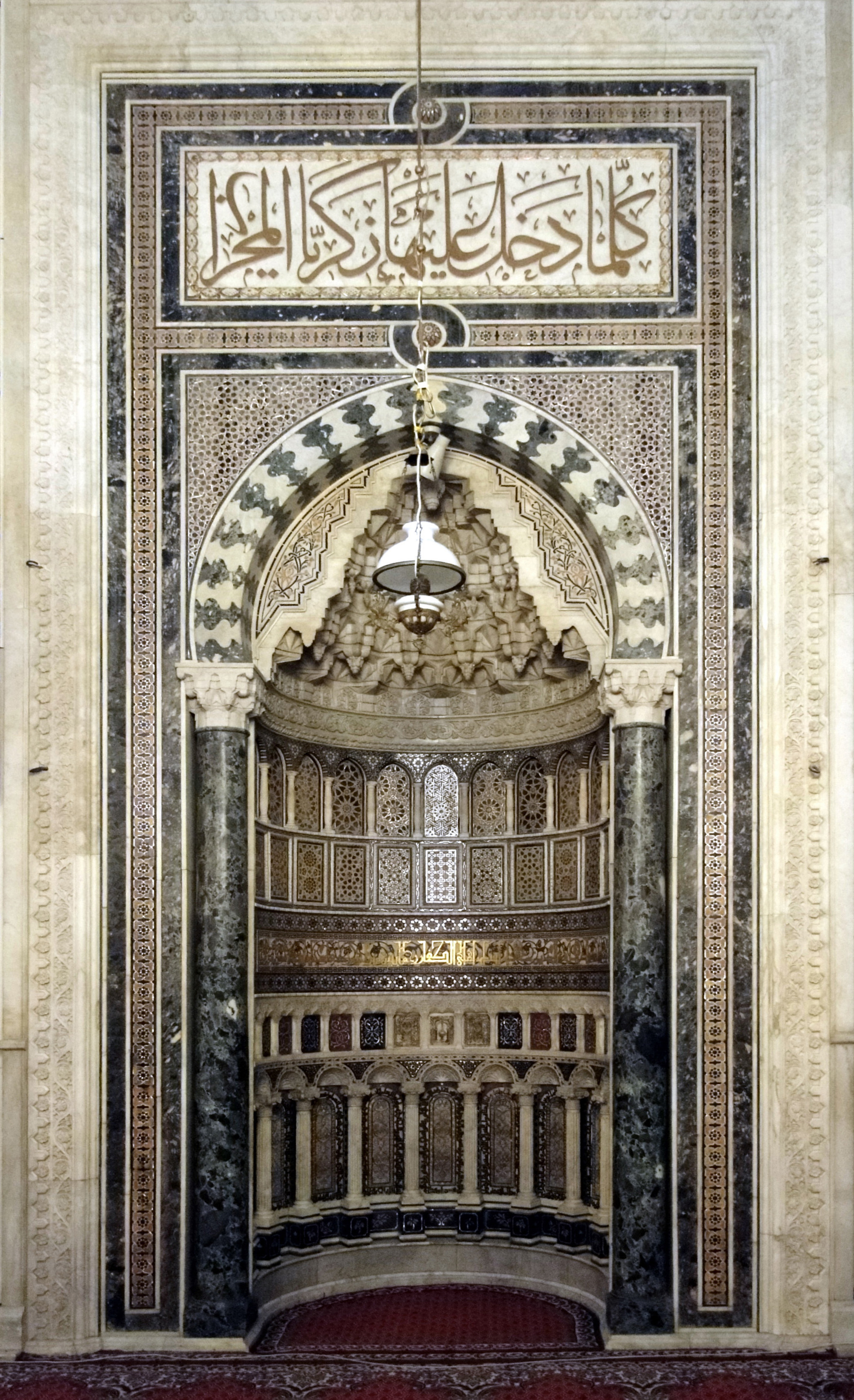
The mihrab of a Umayyad Mosque in Damascus; this niche in the masjid's wall orients Muslims in prayer towards Mecca.

In Islam, the direction of prayer is known as the qibla and this direction is towards the Sacred Mosque (al-Masjid al-Ḥarām) of Mecca. Originally the qibla of Muhammad and his followers in Medina was towards Jerusalem, but it was changed to Mecca after the Quranic verses (Al-Baqarah 2:144, 2:145) were revealed in the second Hijri year (624 CE), about 15 or 16 months after Muhammad's migration to Medina.

If a person does not know which direction they are facing, that individual should pray in the direction that they feel is towards Mecca. All mosques are supposed to be designed to be oriented towards the qibla. A niche known as the mihrab is built into the wall of a mosque that faces Mecca so that Muslims know in which direction to pray.

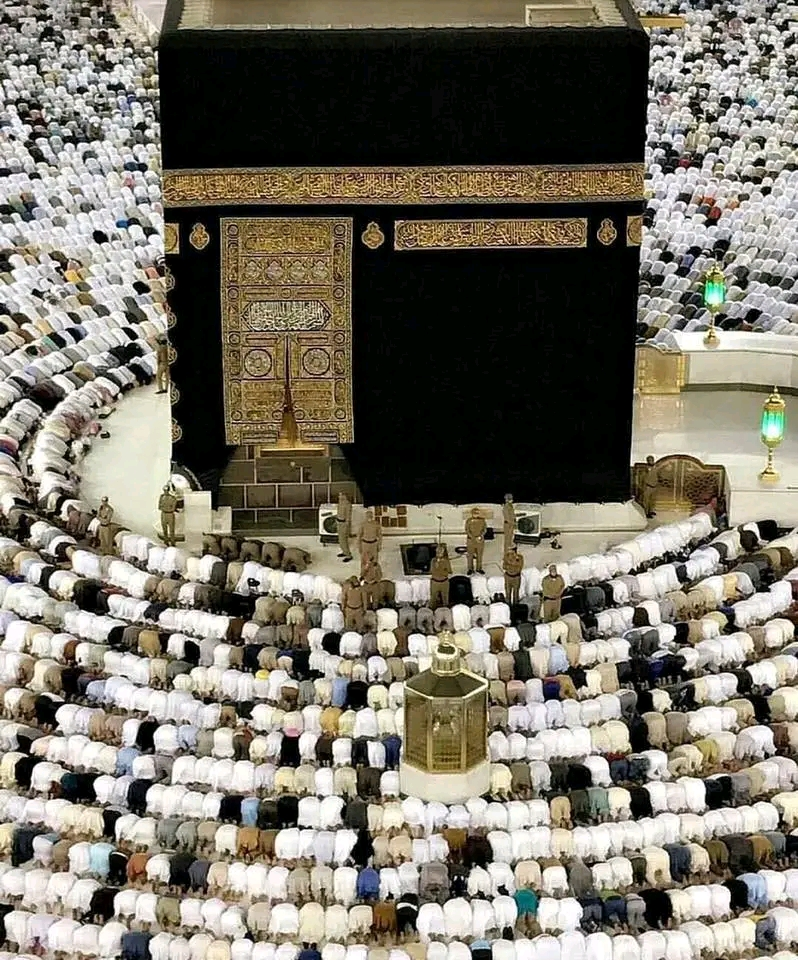
Muslims surrounding and facing the Kaaba for prayer in Mecca, Saudi Arabia; in Islam, the direction of prayer is referred to as qibla.

The determination of the direction of prayer has been an important problem for Muslim communities throughout history. Muslims are required to know the qibla to perform their daily prayers, and it is also needed to determine the orientation of mosques. Originally, various traditional methods were used to determine the qibla, and from the 8th century onwards Muslim astronomers developed methods based on mathematical astronomy, especially computations techniques based on spherical trigonometry using a location's latitudes and longitudes. In the 14th century, the astronomer Shams al-Din al-Khalili compiled a table containing the qibla for all latitudes and longitudes. Scientific instruments, such as the astrolabe, helped Muslims orient themselves for prayer facing the city of Mecca.

== Bahá'í Faith ==
In the Bahá'í Faith, the Qiblih is the direction of prayer towards which adherents focus. It is a "fixed requirement for the recitation of obligatory prayer".

== See also ==
- Fixed prayer times
- Hygiene in Christianity
- Islamic hygienical jurisprudence
- Nanmian
