= Agpeya =

Coptic liturgical book

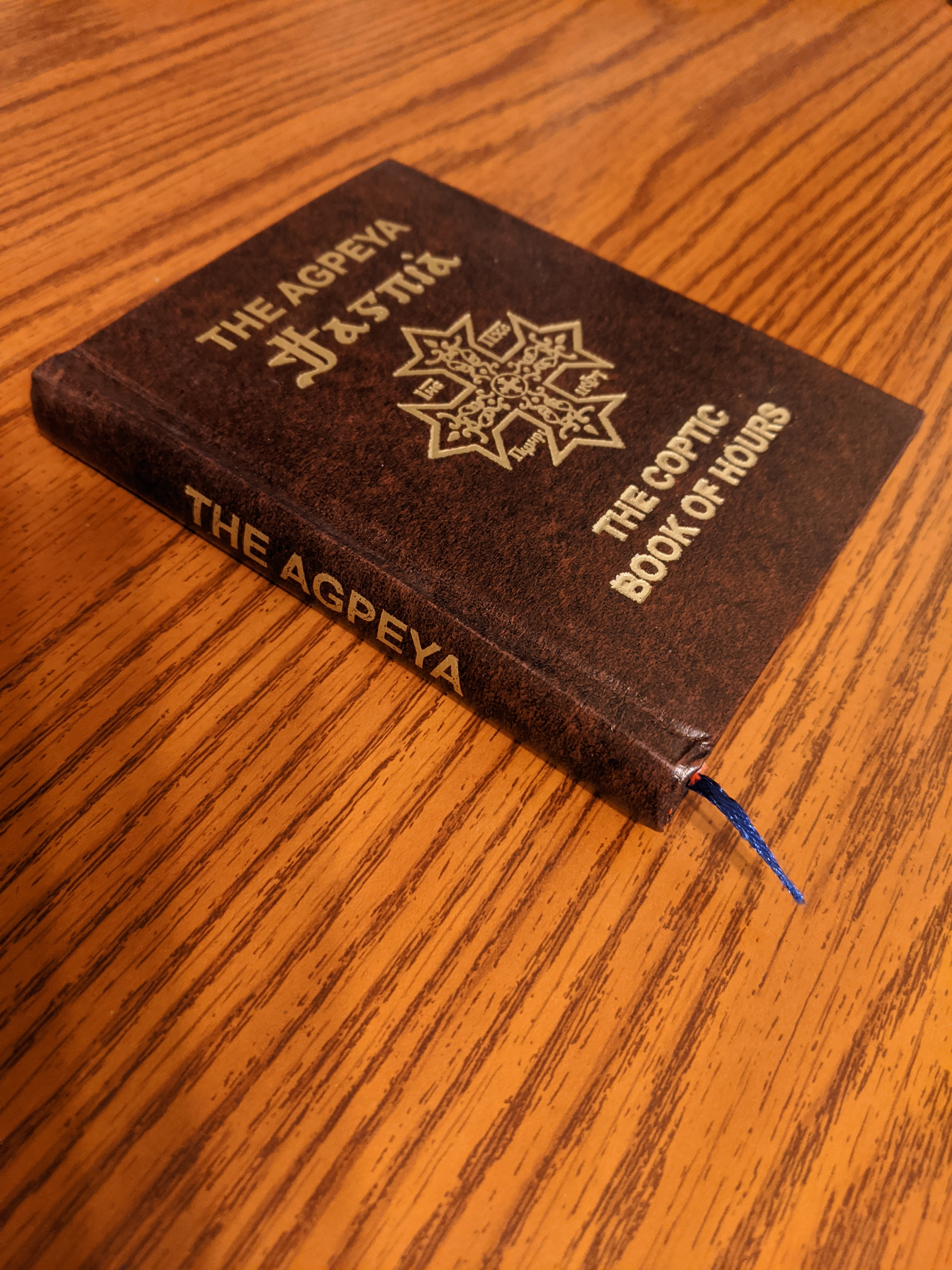
Agpeya

The Agpeya (Coptic: Ϯⲁⲅⲡⲓⲁ, Arabic: أجبية) is the Coptic Christian "Prayer Book of the Hours" or breviary, and is equivalent to the Shehimo in the Syriac Orthodox Church (another Oriental Orthodox Christian denomination), as well as the Byzantine Horologion and Roman Liturgy of the Hours used by the Eastern Orthodox Church and Roman Catholic Church, respectively. The Agpeya prayers are popular Christian prayers recited at fixed prayer times, facing the east by both individuals and families at home seven times a day, as well as for communal prayers as an introduction to Mass at church; this Christian practice has its roots in Psalm 119:164, in which the prophet David prays to God seven times a day. The vast majority of the Coptic Christians learn the recitation and prayers of the Agpeya at an early age as children at home from their families. The Coptic Orthodox cycle of canonical hours is primarily composed of psalm readings from the Old Testament and gospel readings from the New Testament, with some added hymns of praise, troparia (known as "قطع" in the contemporary Arabic Agpeya and as "preces" or "litanies" in English), and other prayers.

Prostrations to God are a cornerstone in praying the Agpeya, with the breviary requiring "prostrating three times in the name of the Trinity; at the end of each Psalm … while saying the ‘Alleluia’; and multiple times" during the forty-one Kyrie eleisons (believers may use the mequteria to count these metanoias).

It includes seven canonical hours, with an additional "Prayer of the Veil" which is usually recited by Bishops, Priests, and Monks. The Coptic terms for 'Matins' and 'Vespers' are 'The Morning Raising of Incense' and 'The Evening Raising of Incense' respectively, with reference to prayers rising to God.

Before praying the Agpeya, Coptic Christians wash their hands and face in order to be clean before and present their best to God; shoes are removed in order to acknowledge that one is offering prayer before a holy God. In this Christian tradition, and in many others as well, it is customary for women to wear a Christian headcovering when praying, a practice explicated in 1 Corinthians 11:5–6. While praying the Agpeya, many believers hold a cross in their hand during the parts where the believer is standing (during which he/she extends his/her arms in the orans position).

== Canonical hours ==
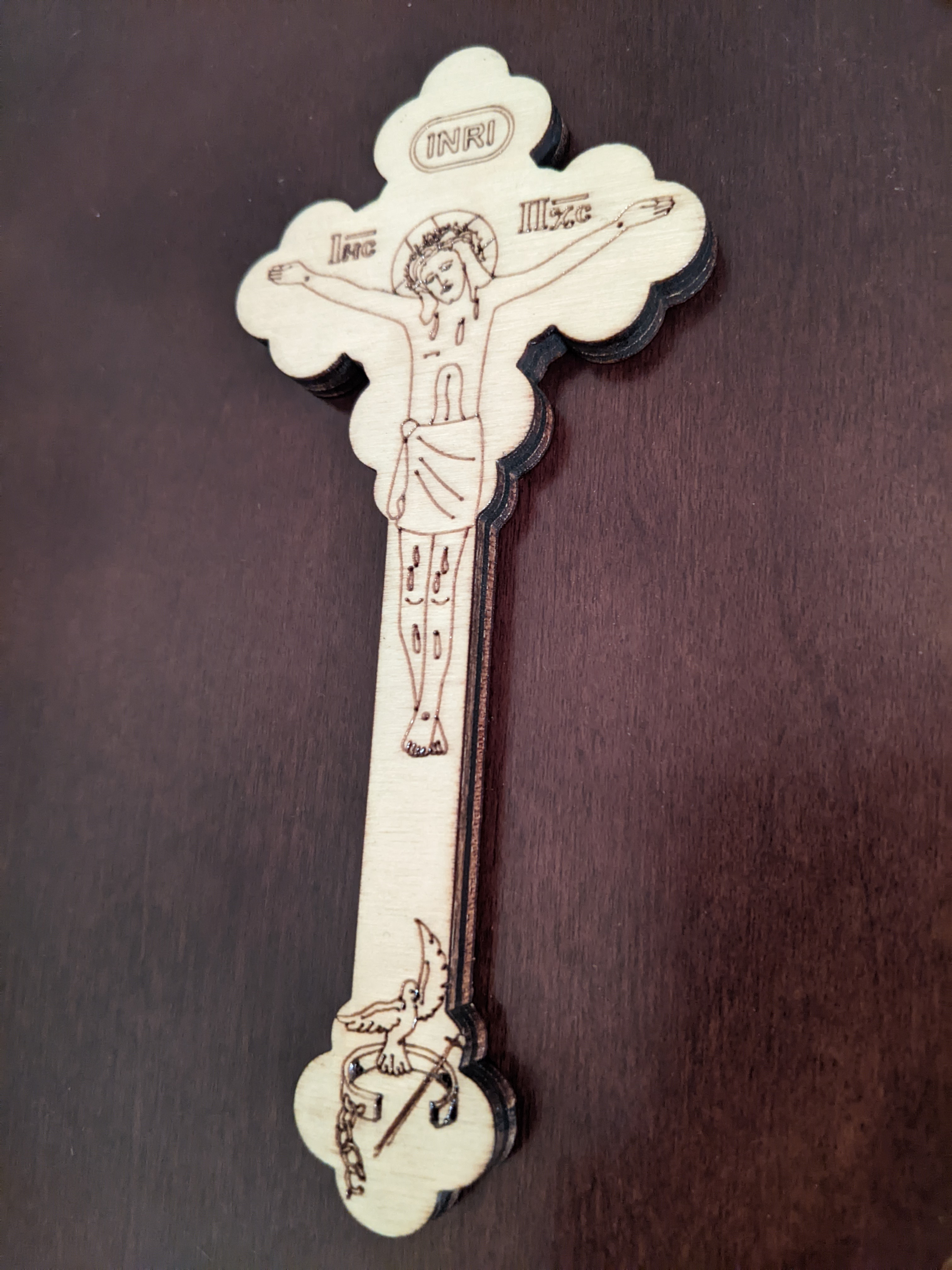
Many believers may hold a hand cross during the parts of the prayer when they are standing with their arms in the orans position.

The hours are chronologically laid out, each containing a theme corresponding to events in the life of Jesus Christ:

- Prime (Morning Raising of Incense) is said at 6 am, upon awaking up in the morning or after the Midnight Praise the previous night. It symbolises Jesus Christ's incarnation and Resurrection.
- Terce (9 am) reminds us of three events, Christ’s trial by Pilate, his ascension to the heavens and the descent of the Holy Spirit upon the disciples at Pentecost.
- Sext (noon) commemorates the Passion of Christ.

Terce and Sext are prayed before each Divine Liturgy.

- None (3 pm) commemorates the death of Christ on the Cross. This hour is also recited during fasting days.
- Vespers (6 pm, Evening Raising of Incense), prayed at sunset (around 5 pm), commemorates the taking down of Christ from the Cross.
- Compline (9 pm - before bedtime) commemorates the burial of Christ, and the Final Judgment.

Vespers and Compline are both recited before the Liturgy during Lent and the fast of Nineveh.

- The "Cetar" or "Veil" is usually recited by bishops, priests and monks, as a form of the examination of conscience. Some individuals and families also elect to recite it as a part of their daily devotions at home.
- The Midnight Hour (said at 12 am, in the early morning before dawn) commemorates the Second Coming of Christ. It consists of three watches, corresponding to the three stages of Christ's prayer in the Garden of Gethsemane (Matthew 25:1–13).

== Structure ==
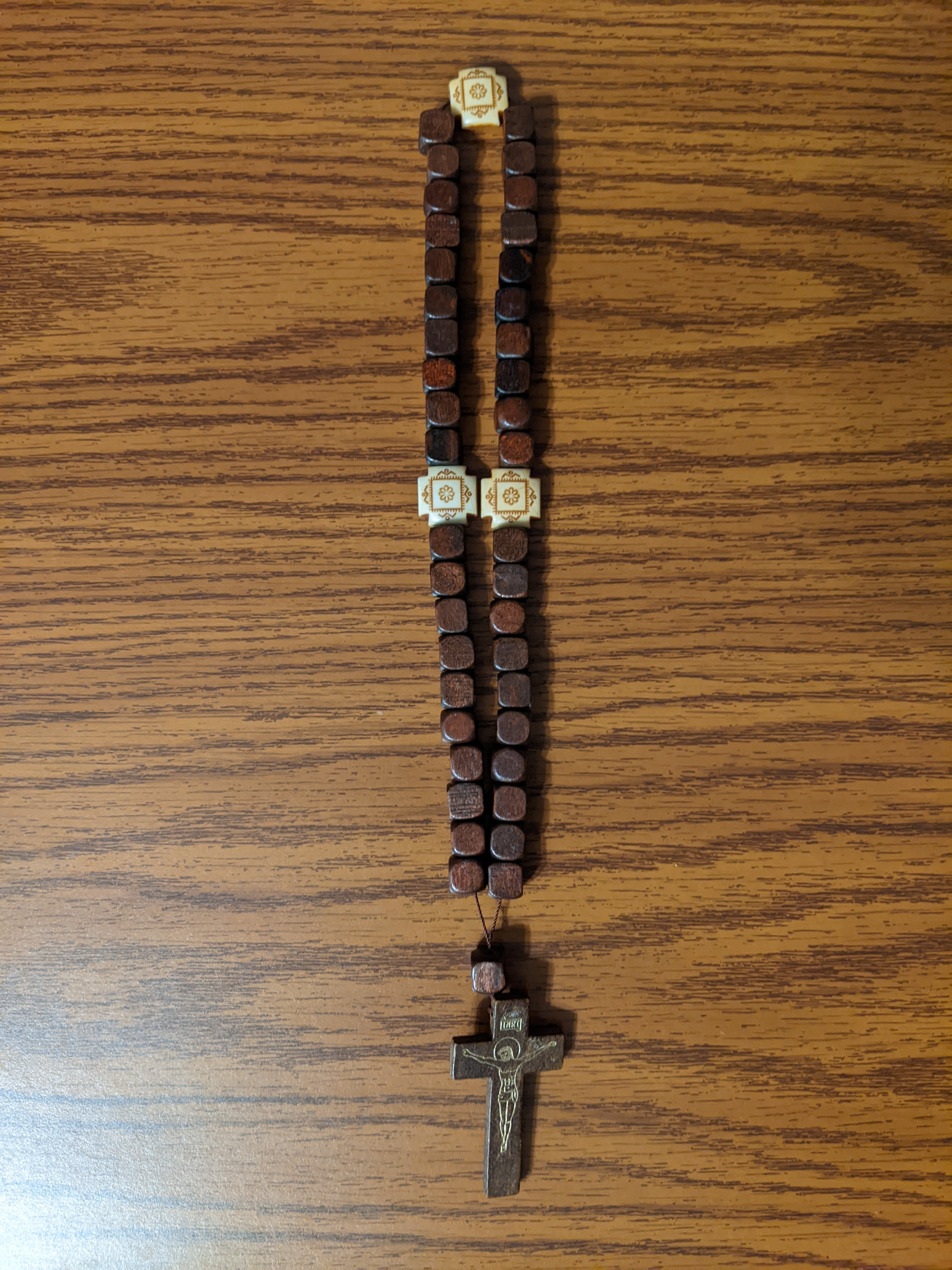
Christian prayer beads called the mequteria may be used to count the 41 Kyrie Eleisons prayed during each fixed prayer time in the Agpeya.

Every one of the Hours follows the same basic outline:

- Introduction, which includes the Lord’s Prayer
- Prayer of Thanksgiving
- Psalm 51 (referred to as Psalm 50 in the Septuagint)
- Various Psalms
- A reading from the Holy Gospel
- 3 or 6 Litanies, with every third one being a Theotokion
- "Lord Have Mercy" is then chanted 41 times (This represents the 39 lashes Jesus Christ received before the crucifixion, plus one for the crown of thorns, plus one for the spear in his side.)
- Prayers
- Absolution
- Conclusion

The conclusion, and most of the litanies and absolutions, are shared with the Byzantine Rite.

== See also ==
- Shehimo
