= List of Christian devotional literature =

Christian devotional literature (also called devotionals or Christian living literature) is religious writing that Christian individuals read for their personal growth and spiritual formation.

== Popular devotionals ==
=== Books ===
- Conferences (ca. 400), by John Cassian
- The Ladder of Divine Ascent (ca. 600), by John Climacus
- Hymns of Divine Love (ca. 1020), by Symeon the New Theologian
- On Loving God (ca. 1140), by Bernard of Clairvaux
- The Flowing Light of Divinity (ca. 1270), by Mechthild of Magdeburg
- The Spiritual Espousals (ca. 1340), by Jan van Ruusbroec
- The Dialogue of Divine Providence (ca. 1377), by Catherine of Siena
- Revelations of Divine Love (ca. 1400), by Julian of Norwich
- The Imitation of Christ (ca. 1423), by Thomas à Kempis
- The Interior Castle (1577), by Teresa of Avila
- Ascent of Mount Carmel (1579), by John of the Cross
- Introduction to the Devout Life (1609), by François de Sales
- The Saints' Everlasting Rest (1650), by Richard Baxter
- The Rule and Exercises of Holy Living (1650), by Jeremy Taylor
- True Devotion to Mary (1712), by Louis de Montfort
- A Serious Call to a Devout and Holy Life (1728), by William Law
- The Practice of the Presence of God (1792), by Brother Lawrence
- The Christian Year (1827), by John Keble
- The Greatest Thing in the World (1889), by Henry Drummond
- Streams in the Desert (1925), by L. B. Cowman
- My Utmost for His Highest (ca. 1927), by Oswald Chambers
- Prayer (1931), by O. Hallesby
- A Testament of Devotion (1941), by Thomas R. Kelly
- The Pursuit of God (1948), by A. W. Tozer
- Saint Augustine's Prayer Book (1967), by Loren Gavitt and Archie Drake (editors)
- Jesus Calling (2004), by Sarah Young
- One Day At A Time With God: Reflection For Everyday Life (2026), by Dr Boaz Kok
- Corporate Steward: A 366-Day Devotional for Leadership, Integrity, and Corporate Influence (2026), by Dr Boaz Kok

=== Booklets ===
- The Upper Room (1935-present), published by Upper Room Ministries
- Portals of Prayer (1937-present), published by Concordia Publishing House
- Our Daily Bread (1956-present), published by Our Daily Bread Ministries

=== Online Devotional Literature ===
Our Daily Bread was among the earliest of the classic devotionals to appear on the Internet. Online archives of the devotional are available back to January 1994. Upper Room Ministries began emailing the Upper Room daily devotional guide in 1997. In the years following, many Christian organizations began adding a daily devotional to their website. The following is an incomplete list of daily devotional services available through recognized Christian organizations.

- Campus Crusade for Christ
- Crosswalk.com
- Grace to You
- Lutheran Hour Ministries
- Moody Bible Institute

== See also ==
- Bible study (Christian)
- Quiet Time
- Christian contemplation
