= Christopher Kaczor =

American philosopher and bioethicist

- Born: 1969 (age 56–57)

Academic background
- Alma mater: Boston College (BA); University of Notre Dame (PhD)
- Doctoral advisor: Ralph McInerny

Academic work
- Discipline: Philosophy
- Sub-discipline: Bioethics, moral philosophy, natural law
- Institutions: Loyola Marymount University
- Notable works: The Ethics of Abortion (2011); A Defense of Dignity (2013); Abortion Rights: For and Against (2018)

Christopher Kaczor (born 1969) is an American philosopher, bioethicist, and author who serves as professor of philosophy at Loyola Marymount University in Los Angeles, California, and president of the American Catholic Philosophical Association. His scholarship focuses on moral philosophy, natural law, bioethics, and Catholic philosophy, particularly the ethics of abortion, personhood, human dignity, reproductive medicine, and conscientious objection. A Fulbright Scholar, Kaczor is also a member of the Vatican's Pontifical Academy for Life and previously served as a doctrinal consultant to the United States Conference of Catholic Bishops.

Kaczor has written extensively on contemporary ethical controversies, including the moral status of embryos and fetuses, euthanasia, assisted reproductive technology, and end-of-life care. Among his publications are The Ethics of Abortion: Women's Rights, Human Life, and the Question of Justice (2011), A Defense of Dignity (2013), and Abortion Rights: For and Against (2018), co-authored with philosopher Kate Greasley. His work on abortion has received attention in academic journals, including Ethics, Notre Dame Philosophical Reviews, and Hypatia Reviews Online.

== Education and academic career ==
Kaczor graduated from Boston College in 1992 and completed his Ph.D. in Medieval Studies at the University of Notre Dame in 1996. His doctoral dissertation, supervised by Ralph McInerny, was titled Thomas Aquinas and Proportionalism: An Evaluation of Their Compatibility. His studies included the work of Thomas Aquinas, Augustine of Hippo, and Alasdair MacIntyre.

He conducted postdoctoral research at the University of Cologne as a Federal Chancellor Fellow and later returned to Germany as a Fulbright Scholar. During the 2014–2015 academic year, he served as the William E. Simon Visiting Fellow in Religion and Public Life at Princeton University's James Madison Program.

In March 2017, Kaczor was appointed to a two-year position as an ethics consultant to the Doctrine Committee of the United States Conference of Catholic Bishops and was named a corresponding member of the Pontifical Academy for Life.

== Philosophical work ==
=== Abortion and personhood ===
Kaczor is known for his philosophical opposition to abortion, particularly through natural law arguments concerning the equal moral status of human beings. In The Ethics of Abortion (2011), he defends the view that all human beings possess a fundamental right to life regardless of developmental stage. His argument challenges accounts of personhood that depend on developed psychological capacities, such as consciousness, rationality, or self-awareness.

The book received attention from philosophers representing differing positions on abortion. David Boonin, author of A Defense of Abortion, described it in a book endorsement as "one of the very best book-length defenses" of the moral impermissibility of abortion. Writing in Notre Dame Philosophical Reviews, philosopher Don Marquis praised Kaczor's detailed criticism of arguments supporting abortion rights, while challenging his central positive argument that all human beings possess a right to life. Marquis nevertheless recommended the book for its substantial engagement with contemporary abortion philosophy. Philosopher David DeGrazia also reviewed the book in Ethics in 2011, describing it as a substantial contribution to philosophical arguments against abortion.

In 2018, Kaczor co-authored Abortion Rights: For and Against with Kate Greasley, presenting opposing philosophical arguments concerning abortion rights and the moral standing of prenatal human life. The book was reviewed by M. T. Lu in Notre Dame Philosophical Reviews, who criticized aspects of the exchange while recognizing the value of Kaczor's engagement with opposing arguments. A separate review in Hypatia Reviews Online by Michelle Oberman and Julia D. Hejduk characterized the book as a carefully reasoned philosophical exchange. Sally Sax, writing in the Canadian Law Library Review, praised the authors' respectful engagement and the book's accessibility to readers unfamiliar with philosophical debates over abortion.

=== Medical ethics and human dignity ===
In A Defense of Dignity (2013), Kaczor examines ethical questions involving reproduction, embryo adoption, ectopic pregnancy, assisted suicide, organ donation, and healthcare workers' rights of conscience. Reviewing the book for the National Catholic Register, John M. Grondelski commended its treatment of human dignity while expressing disagreement with some of Kaczor's conclusions concerning ectopic pregnancy.

== Public commentary ==
Kaczor has contributed to public discussions concerning religion, education, and medical ethics. In 2013, the Los Angeles Times cited his research concerning binge drinking and hookup culture on university campuses.

In December 2023, America interviewed Kaczor regarding Catholic moral reasoning and medically complicated pregnancies in its coverage of the Kate Cox abortion case. He emphasized the protection of human life while distinguishing between abortion intended to end fetal life and intervention intended to save a pregnant woman's life.

Kaczor has also written about the relationship between religion and contemporary psychology. In 2024, Religion News Service interviewed him regarding Jordan Peterson's influence on religious belief and interest in Christianity, following his co-authorship of Jordan Peterson, God, and Christianity.

== Selected publications ==
- The Edge of Life: Human Dignity and Contemporary Bioethics (2005)
- The Ethics of Abortion: Women's Rights, Human Life, and the Question of Justice (2011)
- A Defense of Dignity: Creating Life, Destroying Life, and Protecting the Rights of Conscience (2013)
- The Gospel of Happiness (2015)
- Abortion Rights: For and Against (2018; with Kate Greasley)
- Disputes in Bioethics: Abortion, Euthanasia, and Other Controversies (2020)
- Jordan Peterson, God, and Christianity (2021; with Matthew Petrusek)
- Vital Conflicts: Debating Abortion, Gender Treatments, and Claims of Conscience (2026)
