= Rector Potens, Verax Deus =

Rector Potens, Verax Deus is the name of the daily hymn for the midday office of Sext in the Roman Breviary and in the Benedictine Rite.

== The text of the hymn ==
Latin text	Literal translation
Rector Potens Verax Deus, Qui temperas rerum vices, Splendore mane illuminas,* ( instruis) Et ignibus merediem. Extingue flammas litium, Aufer calorem noxium, Confer salutem corporum, veramque pacem cordium. Praesta, Pater piissime, Patrique compar Unice, Cum Spiritu Paraclito, Regnans per omne sæculum. Amen.	Leader, Powerful, Truthful God (You) who arrange 'of things' the changes With splendor the morning you illuminate* (you establish) And with fire the midday (you illuminate/you establish) Extinguish the flames of argument Take away the harmful heat Grant health of body And-true peace of heart Grant (these things) Father most Holy And-to-the-father the equal unique-one With the Spirit, the Paraclete Reigning through all time. Amen

The original version of the Hymn ended the third line with the verb 'instruis.' This was amended during the Renaissance to the more stylistic verb 'illuminas'

== The purpose and meaning of the hymn ==
As a hymn for the midday office, the focus of the hymn is physically upon the midday sun. Metaphorically and allegorically the hymn goes from the heat of the sun, to the heat of argument, which the hymn asks God's assistance to avoid. In Christian tradition midday was considered the time when Eve was tempted by Satan and committed the first sin, and so this gives added force to the prayer of the hymn, asking God to protect against strife.

The origins of the hymn are unknown. But the similarity of this hymn with the hymns for Terce (Nunc sancte nobis spiritus) and None (Rerum Deus Tenax Vigor) means that it probably shares the same author. Baudot ("The Roman Breviary", London, 1909, 34) thinks the hymn is "probably" by Ambrose. However, none of this set of three hymns are found in the oldest Benedictine collections of hymns, where Ambrose's other works are found. All three of these hymns are found in later Celtic collections. suggesting that they probably have a different author. (For discussion of authorship, see Rerum Deus Tenax Vigor).

== English translations of the hymn ==
J. M. Neale (1818-1866)	J. H. Newman
O GOD of truth, O Lord of might, Who orderest time and change aright, Arraying morn with joyful gleams, And kindling noonday's fiery beams. Extinguish Thou each sinful fire, and banish every ill desire: and while Thou keepest the body whole shed forth Thy peace upon the soul. Almighty Father, hear our cry through Jesus Christ, Our Lord most High Who, with the Holy Ghost and Thee, doth live and reign eternally. Amen.	O God Unchangeable and True, Of all the life and power: Dispensing light in silence through Every successive hour: Lord, Brighten our declining day, That it may never wane, Till death, when all things round decay, Bring back the morn again. This grace on thy redeem'd confer, Father, coequal Son, And Holy Ghost the Comforter, Eternal three in one.

== Music and chants for the hymn ==
The hymn has been set to many different tunes. The following links give examples:

- Rector Potens Verax Deus (Ferial Tone)
- Rector Potens (Schola Hungarica)
