= Ladder of Divine Ascent (Tzanes) =

Painting by Emmanuel Tzanes

- Κλίμακα Ιωάννου (Greek), Scala dell'Ascesa Divina (Italian)
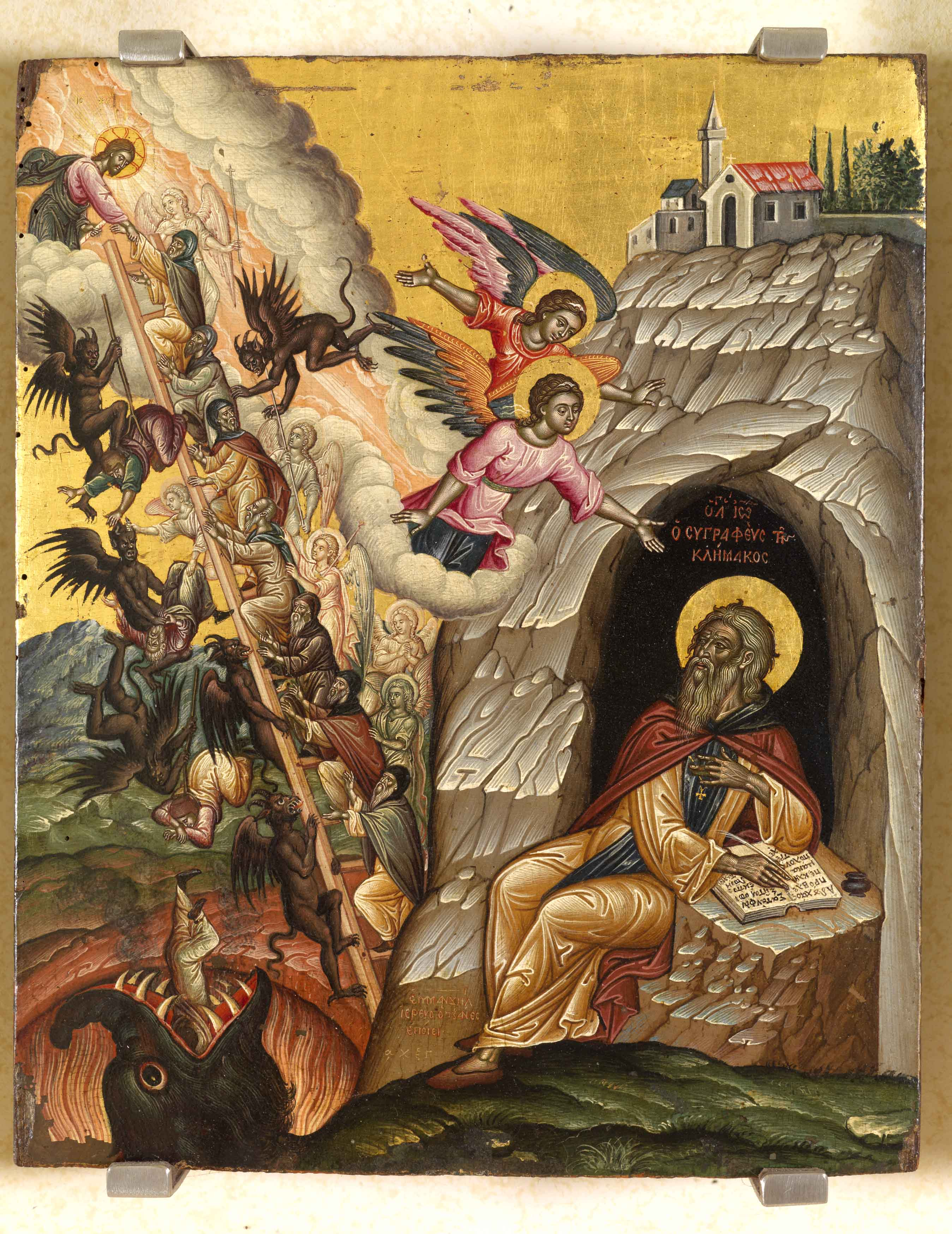
- Artist: Emmanuel Tzanes
- Year: 1663
- Medium: tempera on wood
- Movement: Late Cretan school
- Subject: John Climacus, Ladder of Divine Ascent
- Dimensions: 33 cm × 26.9 cm (13 in × 10.6 in)
- Location: Hellenic Institute of Venice, Venice, Italy
- Owner: Hellenic Institute of Venice
- Accession: AMI 71
- Website: Website

Ladder of Divine Ascent is a tempera painting created by painter and priest Emmanuel Tzanes. Tzanes flourished during the 17th century in Crete, Corfu, and Venice, Italy and his catalog of works numbers over 130. He was a member of an artistic family and both his brothers Konstantinos Tzanes and Marinos Tzanes were painters but Konstantinos is better known for his famous poem about Crete entitled The Cretan War (Greek: Ο Κρητικός Πόλεμος, O Kritikos Polemos). The family eventually settled in Venice where Emmanuel was elected priest of San Giorgio dei Greci where he completed a large number of his works from 1660 to 1690. Three years after his appointment he completed Ladder of Divine Ascent. Tzanes painted in the traditional Greek mannerisms or maniera greca following the lines of the Cretan School but also integrated the predominant painting style of Venice during that period.

John Climacus was a 6th–7th century monk affiliated with Saint Catherine's Monastery. Climacus wrote a book entitled The Ladder of Divine Ascent which uses the analogy of Jacob's Ladder as the framework for his spiritual teaching. The book was a philosophical guide for monastic life following the teachings of Jesus Christ written for Abba John, Abbot of Raithu. In his book, there are 30 steps of a ladder. The Ladder describes how to raise one's soul and body to God by acquiring ascetic virtues. Countless painters adopted the theme of the Ladder of Divine Ascent. An unknown painter completed a work of the Ladder of Divine Ascent in the 12th century which is located at Saint Catherine's Monastery on Mount Sinai.

Hell mouth was a common figure in ancient Greek and Roman art and was adopted by early Greek-Italian Byzantine painters. One of the earliest versions of the work was completed by Douris in 500 BCE. The figure is typically featured in Last Judgement paintings surrounded by demons some include The Last Judgment (Klontzas), The Last Judgment (Moskos), The Last Judgment (Kavertzas), and The Last Judgement by Fra Angelico. Elias Moskos completed a similar work during the same period Tzanes completed the Ladder of Divine Ascent entitled Jacob's Ladder. Both works feature a ladder in the same orientation, in the Moskos, Jacob is sleeping under the ladder and figures climb the ladder into heaven. The Dormition and Assumption of the Virgin another work by Moskos features angels that resemble the angels in Ladder of Divine Ascent by Tzanes. The Ladder of Divine Ascent by Tzanes was a gift by Dimitrios Filippis to the Confraternity of the Greeks which was affiliated with San Giorgio dei Greci. The icon is part of the collection of the Hellenic Institute of Byzantine and Post-Byzantine Studies in Venice.

== Description ==
Ladder of Divine Ascent is a tempera painting on gold leaf and wood panel. The height is 13 in (33 cm) and the width is 10.6 in (26.9 cm). The work was completed in 1663 after the painter migrated from Corfu to Venice and became the priest of San Giorgio dei Greci. The work follows the traditional Greek Italian Byzantine painting style. The figure of John Climacus is outside of a monastic cave which is adorned by a monastery structure symbolizing Saint Catherine's Monastery in Mount Sinai.

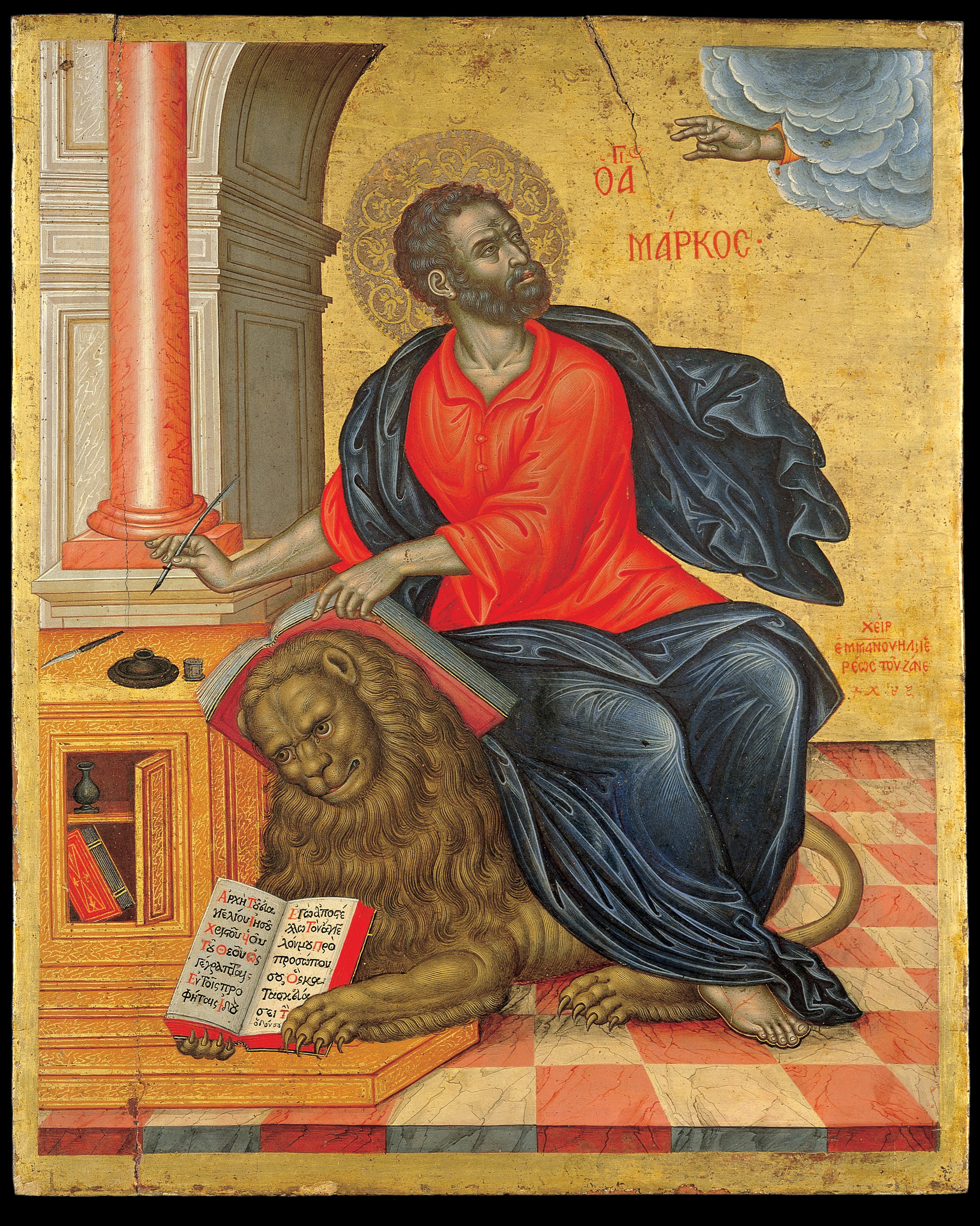
Saint Mark by Tzanes

Tzanes was a remarkable painter who significantly refined the maniera greca the figure of Climacus resembles Saint Mark a work completed by Tzanes six years prior. Tzanes implemented refined detail in Saint Mark's face a style he continued to implement in his work of Climacus. The brushstrokes of his beard establish lines, contours, and grooves while the painter clearly reveals his hair waves.

The painter adds human anatomical features to Climacus where veins are visible and he implements a shading technique on his face which features an expression of amazement and reverence as he compiles his book of philosophical theological knowledge. Two angels appear above the monk and to our left an entire story unfolds with 6 angels and 6 demons fighting for the souls of the righteous over Jacobs Ladder. There are seven monks on the latter four are taken away by demons with eleven monks total or twelve including Climacus. The ladder of divine ascent leads to Jesus Christ who is awaiting the righteous. An angel is also at the top of the ladder overjoyed in the presence of Jesus Christ.

== Gallery ==
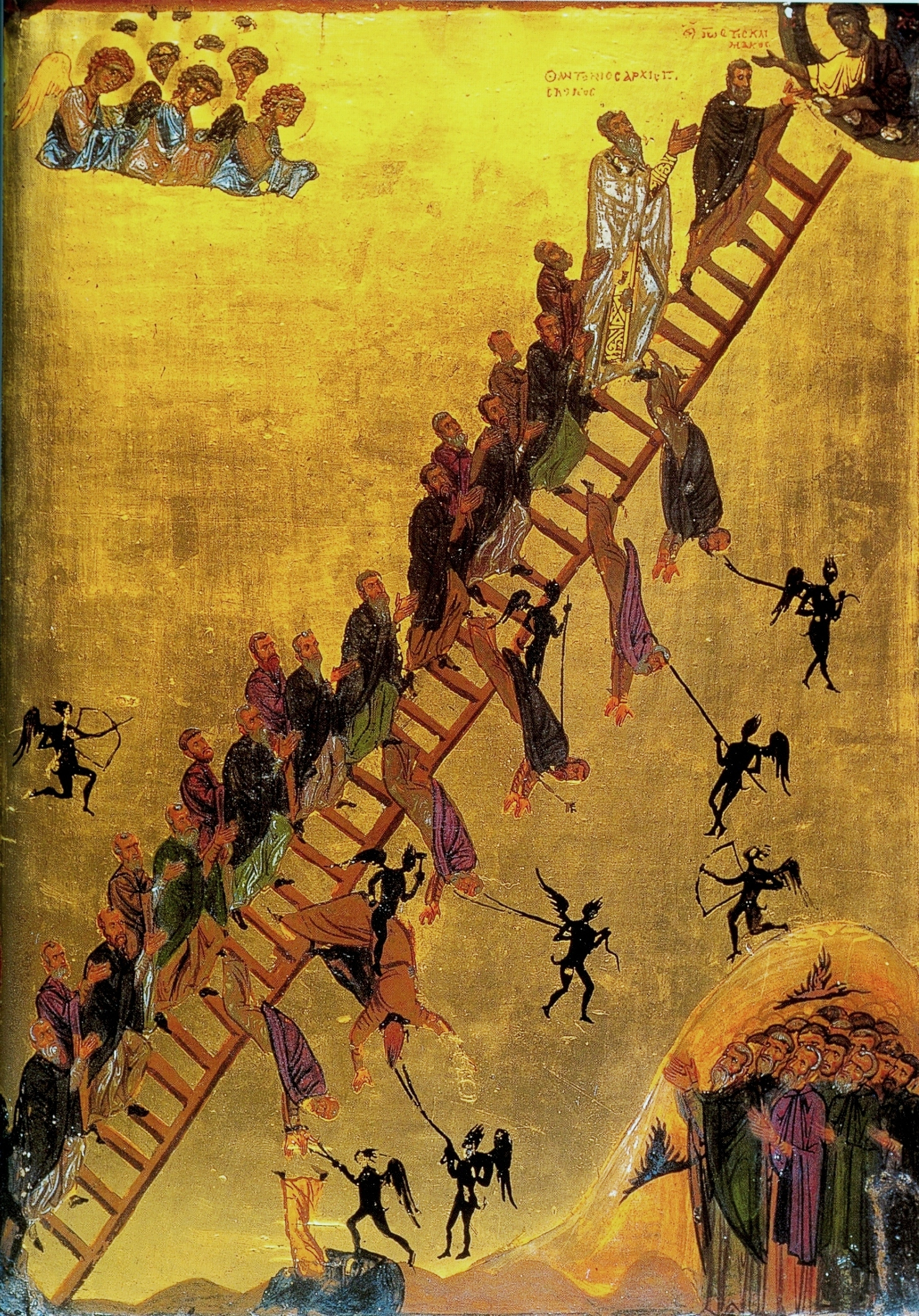
Unknown painter 12 century

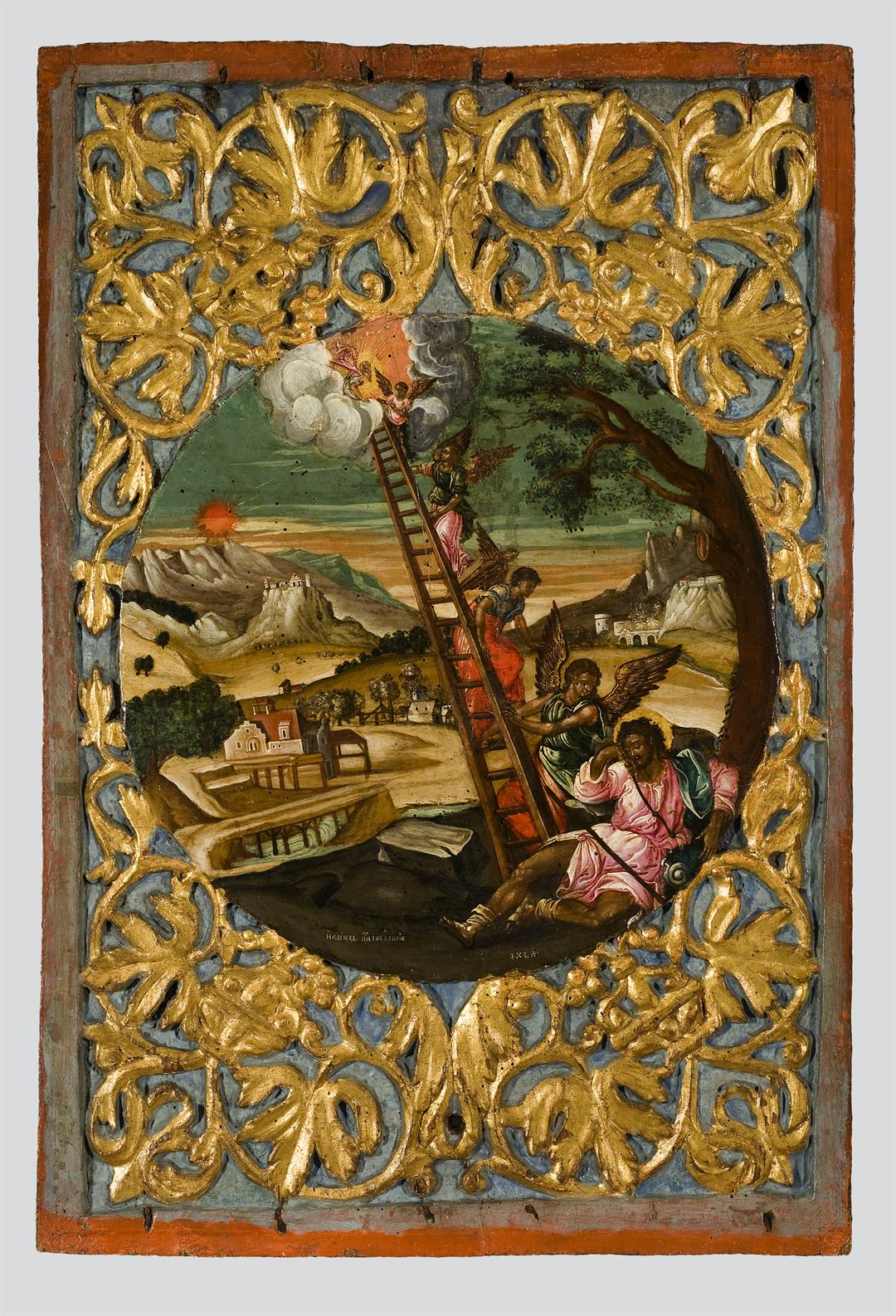
Jacob's Ladder by Moskos 1660s

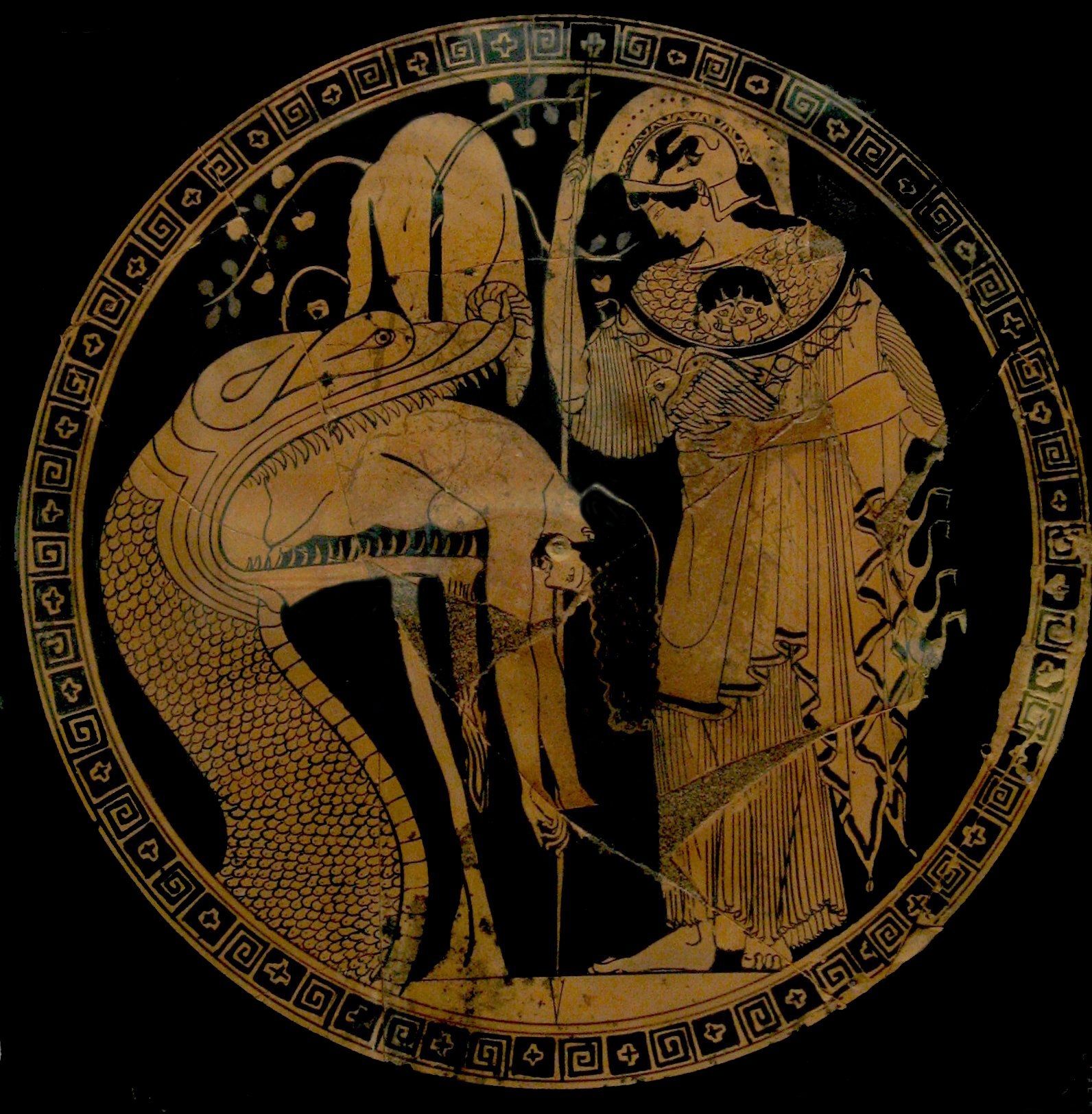
Douris Hell Mouth 500 BCE

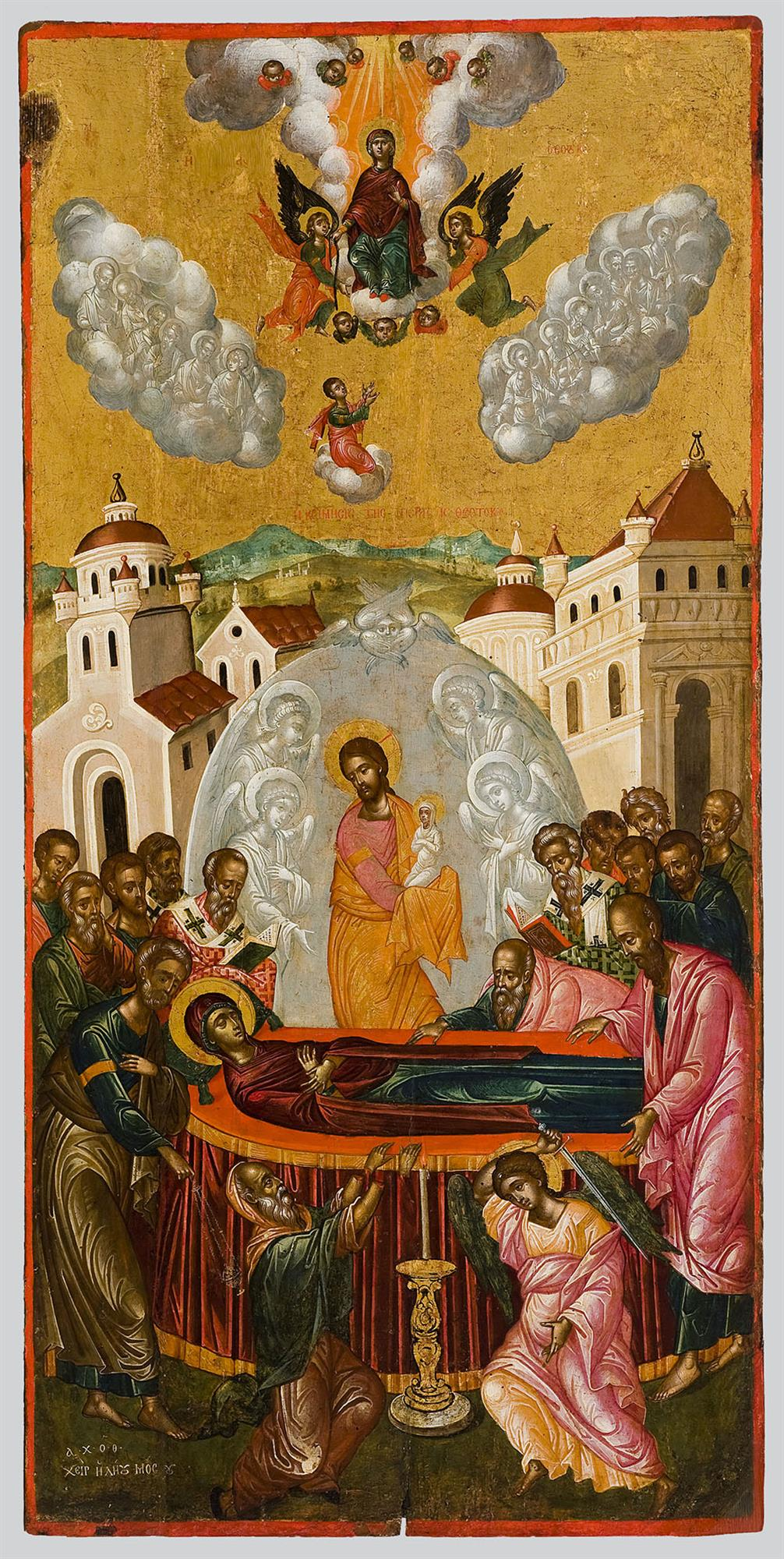
Similar Painted Angels by Moskos

== Bibliography ==
- Hatzidakis, Manolis; Drakopoulou, Evgenia (1997). Έλληνες Ζωγράφοι μετά την Άλωση (1450-1830). Τόμος 2: Καβαλλάρος - Ψαθόπουλος [Greek Painters after the Fall of Constantinople (1450-1830). Volume 2: Kavallaros - Psathopoulos] (in Greek). Athens: Center for Modern Greek Studies, National Research Foundation. hdl:10442/14088. ISBN 960-7916-00-X.
- Siopis, Ioannis (2016). Το θέμα της Δευτέρας Παρουσίας στις Εικόνες [A Detailed History of the Second Coming (Last Judgment) in Greek Paintings] (PDF) (in Greek). Thessaloniki, Greece: Aristotle University of Thessaloniki School of Philosophy Division of Archaeology and History.
- Tselenti-Papadopoulou, Niki G. (2002). Οι Εικονες της Ελληνικης Αδελφοτητας της Βενετιας απο το 16ο εως το Πρωτο Μισο του 20ου Αιωνα: Αρχειακη Τεκμηριωση [The Icons of the Greek Brotherhood of Venice from 1600 to First Half of the 20th Century] (PDF) (in Greek). Athens: Ministry of Culture Publication of the Archaeological Bulletin No. 81. ISBN 960-214-221-9.
- Collins, Kristen M. (2006). Holy Image, Hallowed Ground: Icons from Sinai. Los Angeles: California: J. Paul Getty Museum. ISBN 9780892368563.
- Climacus, John (1959). The Ladder of Divine Ascent (PDF). Translated by Moore, Archimandrite Lazarus. New York: Harper Brothers Publishing.
- Chryssavgis, John (2 March 2017). John Climacus: From the Egyptian Desert to the Sinaite Mountain. New York: Routledge. ISBN 978-1-351-92521-1.
