= Uncial 0284 =

- New Testament manuscript
- Text: Matthew 26:75-27:7; 27:9-11.13-17; 28:15-18.20 †
- Date: 8th century
- Script: Greek
- Found: 1975
- Now at: Saint Catherine's Monastery
- Size: [28 cm x 21 cm]
- Type: ?
- Category: ?

Uncial 0284 (in the Gregory-Aland numbering), is a Greek uncial manuscript of the New Testament. Paleographically it has been assigned to the 8th century.

== Description ==
The codex contains a small parts of the Gospel of Matthew 26:75-27:7; 27:9-11.13-17; 28:15-18.20, on 2 parchment leaves (28 cm by 21 cm). The text is written in two columns per page, 29 lines per page, in uncial letters. The leaves have survived in a fragmentary condition. It is a palimpsest. The upper text contains Scala paradisi of Johannes Climacus.

Currently it is dated by the INTF to the 8th century.

== Location ==
It is one of the manuscripts discovered in Saint Catherine's Monastery at Sinai in May 1975, during the restoration work. Currently the codex is housed at the St. Catherine's Monastery (N.E. ΜΓ 48) in Sinai.

== See also ==
- List of New Testament uncials
- Biblical manuscript
- Textual criticism
