= Deus =

Latin for "deity"

Deus (Classical Latin: [ˈd̪e.ʊs], Ecclesiastical Latin: [ˈd̪ɛː.us]) is the Latin word for "deity". Latin deus and dīvus ('divine') are in turn descended from Proto-Indo-European *deiwos, "celestial" or "shining", from the same root as *Dyēus, the reconstructed chief god of the Proto-Indo-European pantheon.

In Classical Latin, deus ("dea" in the feminine) was a general noun referring to a deity, while in technical usage a divus or diva was a figure who had become divine, such as a divinized emperor. In Late Latin, Deus came to be used mostly for the Christian God. It was inherited by the Romance languages in Galician and Portuguese Deus, Catalan and Sardinian Déu, French and Occitan Dieu, Friulian and Sicilian Diu, Italian Dio, Spanish Dios and (for the Jewish God) Ladino דייו/דיו Dio/Dyo, etc., and by the Celtic languages in Welsh Duw, and Irish and Scottish Gaelic Dia.

== Cognates ==
While Latin deus can be translated as and bears superficial similarity to Greek θεός theós, meaning 'god', these are false cognates. A true cognate is Ancient Greek Zeus, king of the Olympian gods in Greek mythology (Attic Greek: Ζεύς, romanized: Zeús, Attic Greek: [zděu̯s] or [dzěu̯s]; Doric Greek: Δεύς, romanized: Deús, Doric Greek: [děu̯s]). In the archaic period, the initial Zeta would have been pronounced such that Attic Ζεύς would phonetically transliterate as Zdeús or Dzeús, from Proto-Hellenic *dzéus.

By combining a form of deus with the Ancient Roman word for 'father' (Latin: pater, [ˈpa.t̪ɛr]), one derives the name of the mythical Roman equivalent of Zeus: the sky god Diespiter ([d̪iˈɛs.pɪ.t̪ɛr]), later called Iuppiter or Jūpiter, from Proto-Italic *djous patēr, descended from Proto-Indo-European root *Dyḗws*Pahtḗr literally meaning 'Sky Father'. From the same root is derived the Greek vocative 'O father Zeus' (Attic Greek: Ζεῦ πάτερ, romanized: Zeû páter), and whence is also derived the name of the Hindu sky god Dyáuṣ Pitṛ́ (Vedic Sanskrit: Dyáuṣpitṛ́, द्यौष्पितृ), and Proto-Germanic *Tīwaz or Tius hence Old Norse Týr.

== Usage ==
=== Latin phrases with deus ===
Nobiscum deus ('God with us') was a battle cry of the late Roman Empire and of the Byzantine Empire. The name Amadeus translates to 'for love of God'. The genitive singular/nominative-vocative plural dei occurs in such phrases as Roman Catholic organization Opus Dei ('work of God'), Agnus Dei ('Lamb of God') and Dei Gratia ('By the Grace of God'). The ablative/accusative deo occurs in expressions as Deo Optimo Maximo ('to God, most good, most great').

- Agnus Dei
- Deo Juvante
- Deo vindice
- Deus absconditus
- Deus ex machina
- Deus otiosus
- Deus sive Natura
- Deus vult
- Divs
- Munificentissimus Deus
- Nihil sine Deo
- Opus Dei
- Pro Deo et patria
- Providentissimus Deus
- Quis ut Deus
- Rector Potens, Verax Deus
- Regnator omnium deus
- Rerum, Deus, tenax vigor
- Rex Deus
- Sublimis Deus
- Te Deum
- Unigenitus dei filius
- Vox populi, vox Dei

=== In the Latin Bible ===
Latin Deus consistently translates Greek Θεός Theós in both the Vetus Latina and Jerome's Vulgate. In the Septuagint, Greek Theós in turn renders Hebrew Elohim (אֱלוֹהִים, אלהים), as in Genesis 1:1:

- Masoretic Text Biblical Hebrew: בְּרֵאשִׁית בָּרָא אֱלֹהִים אֵת הַשָּׁמַיִם וְאֵת הָאָרֶץ., romanized: B'reshít bará Elohím et hashamáyim w'et haʾáretz.
- Septuagint Koine Greek: Ἐν ἀρχῇ ἐποίησεν ὁ Θεὸς τὸν οὐρανὸν καὶ τὴν γῆν., romanized: En archê epoíēsen ho Theòs tòn ouranòn kaì tḕn gên.
- Vulgate Latin: In principio creavit Deus cælum et terram.
- English: In the beginning God created the heaven and the earth.

=== Post-classical usage ===
In Cartesian philosophy, the phrase deus deceptor is sometimes used to discuss the possibility of an evil God that seeks to deceive us. This character is related to a skeptical argument as to how much we can really know if an evil demon were attempting to thwart our knowledge. Another is the deus otiosus ('idle god'), which is a creator god who largely retires from the world and is no longer involved in its daily operation. A similar concept is that of the deus absconditus ('hidden god') of Thomas Aquinas. Both refer to a deity whose existence is not readily knowable by humans through either contemplation or examination of divine actions. The concept of deus otiosus often suggests a god who has grown weary from involvement in this world and who has been replaced by younger, more active gods, whereas deus absconditus suggests a god who has consciously left this world to hide elsewhere.

== Derived words ==
The word de-us is the root of deity, and thereby of deism, pandeism, and polydeism, all of which are theories in which any divine figure is absent from intervening in human affairs. This curious circumstance originates from the use of the word "deism" in the 17th and 18th centuries as a contrast to the prevailing "theism", belief in an actively intervening God:

The new religion of reason would be known as Deism. It had no time for the imaginative disciplines of mysticism and mythology. It turned its back on the myth of revelation and on such traditional "mysteries" as the Trinity, which had for so long held people in the thrall of superstition. Instead it declared allegiance to the impersonal "Deus".

By 1888, it was written in the Encyclopaedia Britannica: "Although deus and theos are equivalent, deism has come to be distinguished from theism. The former word first appeared in the 16th century, when it was used to designate antitrinitarian opinions. In the 17th century it came to be applied to the view that the light of nature is the only light in which man can know God, no special revelation having been given to the human race." Followers of these theories, and occasionally followers of pantheism, may sometimes refer to God as "Deus" or "the Deus" to make clear that the entity being discussed is not a theistic "God". Arthur C. Clarke picks up this usage in his novel 3001: The Final Odyssey. William Blake said of the Deists that they worship "the Deus of the Heathen, The God of This World, & the Goddess Nature, Mystery, Babylon the Great, The Druid Dragon & hidden Harlot".

== See also ==
- God (word)
