= Climacus =

Climacus may refer to:

- John Climacus, a 7th-century Greek monk and saint
- Climacus (neume), one of the ligature note shapes in Gregorian chant notation
