= Rerum =

Rerum may refer to:

- Lacrimae rerum is the Latin for tears for things.
- Rerum novarum is an encyclical issued by Pope Leo XIII on May 16, 1891.
- Rerum Moscoviticarum Commentarii was a Latin book by Baron Sigismund von Herberstein on the geography, history and customs of Muscovy.
- Rerum Deus Tenax Vigor is the daily hymn for None in the Roman Catholic Breviary.
- Silva rerum was a specific type of a book, a multi-generational chronicle.
