= Midday prayer =

Midday prayer may refer to:

- Sext, a fixed time of prayer of the Divine Office
- Zuhr prayer, the Islamic midday prayer.
