= Rerum, Deus, tenax vigor =

Daily hymn for None in the Roman Catholic Breviary

Rerum Deus Tenax Vigor is the daily hymn for None in the Roman Catholic Breviary.

== Translations of the hymn ==
Latin text	J Ellerton (d1893)
RERUM, Deus, tenax vigor, immotus in te permanens, lucis diurnae tempora successibus determinans, Largire lumen (clarum) vespere, quo vita numquam decidat, sed praemium mortis sacrae perennis instet gloria. Praesta, Pater piissime, Patrique compar Unice, cum Spiritu Paraclito regnans per omne saeculum. Amen.	O STRENGTH and Stay upholding all creation Who ever dost Thyself unmoved abide, yet day by day the light in due gradation from hour to hour though all its changes guide; Grant to life's day a calm unclouded ending, an eve untouched by shadows of decay, the brightness of a holy deathbed blending with dawning glories of the eternal day. Hear us, O Father, gracious and forgiving, and Thou, O Christ, the coeternal Word, Who, with the Holy Ghost by all things living, now and to endless ages art adored. Amen.

The original version of the hymn had the word "lumen" in the first line of the second verse, but some versions substituted the word "clarum" instead of lumen.

== Meaning and purpose of the hymn ==
It comprises (like the hymns for Terce and Sext) only two stanzas of iambic dimeters together with a doxology, varying according to the feast or season.

As in the hymns for Prime, Sext and Compline, the theme is found in the steady march of the sun, that defines the periods of the day (and provided the basis of Roman and monastic chronology):

Rerum, Deus, tenax vigor
Immotus in te permanens,
Lucis diurnæ tempora
Successibus determinans '.

which translates (not literally, nor strictly by verse):

'O God, whose power unmoved the whole of Nature's vastness doth control,

Who mark'st the day-hours as they run by steady marches of the sun'.

The moral application is, as usual, made in the following stanza:

Largire lumen vespere 'O grant that in life's eventide'
Quo vita nusquam decidat, etc. 'Thy light may e'er with us abide', etc.

The authorship of the hymns for Terce, Sext and None is now ascribed only very doubtfully to St. Ambrose. They are not given to the saint by the Benedictine editors (see Ambrosian Hymnography), but are placed by Luigi Biraghi amongst his inni sinceri, since they are found in all the MSS. of the churches of Milan. Daniel (I, 23: IV, 13, 17) thinks that much longer hymns for the hours were replaced by the present ones. Pimont disagrees arguing that the saint may well have composed two sets of hymns for the hours. However, the researches of Blume (1908) show that the primitive Benedictine cycle of hymns, as attested by the Rules of Cæsarius and Aurelian of Arles, did not include these hymns, but assigned for Terce, Sext and None (for Eastertide) the hymns: "Jam surgit hora tertia", "Jam sexta sensim volvitur", "Ter hora trina volvitur"; the earliest MSS. of the cycle give for these hours, for the remainder of the year, the hymns: "Certum tenentes ordinem", "Dicamus laudes Domino", "Perfectum trinum numerum"; while other MSS. give as variants for Lent: "Dei fide qua vivimus", "Meridie orandum est", "Sic ter quaternis trahitur". This Benedictine cycle was replaced throughout Western Christendom by a later one, as shown by Irish and English MSS. which give the present hymns for the little hours.
