= None (liturgy) =

Time of prayer of the Liturgy of hours in the afternoon

None ("Ninth"), also known as Nones, the Ninth Hour, is part of the Divine Office of almost all the traditional Christian liturgies. It consists mainly of psalms and is said around 3 pm, about the ninth hour after dawn.

In the Roman Rite, the Nones are one of the so-called Little Hours. In the Oriental Orthodox Churches, such as the Coptic Orthodox Church, Ethiopian Orthodox Church and Indian Orthodox Church, it is one of the seven fixed prayer times to be recited by all Christians.

== History ==
=== Origin ===
According to an Ancient Greek and Roman custom, the day was, like the night, divided into four parts, each consisting of three hours. Among the ancients the hour of None was regarded as the close of the day's business and the time for the baths and supper. This division of the day was in vogue also among the Jews, from whom the Church borrowed it. In addition to Morning and Evening Prayer to accompany the sacrifices, there was prayer at the Third, Sixth and Ninth Hours of the day.

=== Early Church ===
The Apostles continued to frequent the Temple at the customary hours of prayer (Acts 3:1): "Now Peter and John went up into the temple at the ninth hour of prayer."

At an early date, mystical reasons for the division of the day were sought. St. Cyprian sees in the hours of Terce, Sext and None, which come after a lapse of three hours, an allusion to the Trinity. He adds that these hours already consecrated to prayer under the Old Dispensation have been sanctified in the New Testament by great mysteries: Terce by the descent of the Holy Spirit on the Apostles; Sext by the prayers of St. Peter, the reception of the Gentiles into the Church, or yet again by the crucifixion of Christ; None by the death of Christ. St. Basil merely recalls that it was at the ninth hour that the Apostles Peter and John were wont to go to the Temple to pray. St. John Cassian, who adopts the Cyprian interpretation for Terce and Sext, sees in the Hour of None the descent of Christ into hell. But, as a rule, it is the death of Christ that is commemorated at the Hour of None.

The most ancient testimony refers to this custom of Terce, Sext, and None, for instance Tertullian, Clement of Alexandria, the Canons of Hippolytus, and even the Didache ("Teaching of the Apostles"). The Didache prescribed prayer thrice each day, without, however, fixing the hours. Clement of Alexandria and likewise Tertullian, as early as the end of the 2nd century, expressly mention the Canonical Hours of Terce, Sext, and None, as specially set apart for prayer. Tertullian argues for constant prayer with no prescribed time, but adds: "As regards the time, there should be no lax observation of certain hours—I mean of those common hours which have long marked the divisions of the day, the third, the sixth, and the ninth, and which we may observe in Scripture to be more solemn than the rest."

Clement and Tertullian in these passages refer only to private prayer at these hours. The Canons of Hippolytus also speak of Terce, Sext, and None as suitable hours for private prayer; however, on the two station days, Wednesday and Friday, when the faithful assembled in the church, and perhaps on Sundays, these hours were recited successively in public. In the 4th century there is evidence to show that the practice had become obligatory, at least for the monks.

The eighteenth canon of the Council of Laodicea (between 343 and 381) orders that the same prayers be always said at None and Vespers. It is likely that reference is made to some litanies, in which prayer was offered for the catechumens, sinners, the faithful, and generally for all the wants of the Church. John Cassian states that the most common practice was to recite three psalms at each of the Hours of Terce, Sext, and None.

=== Since the 7th century ===
Practices varied from monastery to monastery. At first some tried to do the entire Psalter (150 Psalms) each day, but eventually that was abandoned for a weekly cycle built around certain hours of the day. In the Rule of St. Benedict the four Little Hours of the day (Prime, Terce, Sext and None) were conceived on the same plan, the formulae alone varying. The Divine Office began with the Invitatory, like all the Canonical Hours; then follows a hymn, special to None; three psalms, which do not change (Psalm 125, 126, 127), except on Sundays and Mondays when they are replaced by three groups of eight verses from Psalm 118; then the capitulum, a versicle, the Kyrie, the Lord's Prayer, the oratio, and the concluding prayers.

Medieval writers attribute various mystical characteristics to the Hour of None. Amalarius of Metz opines that the human spirit sinks at None alongside the setting sun, opening the soul to diabolical temptation. Other medievals claim ancient associations between the number nine and imperfection and mourning. One folk belief holds that Adam and Eve were driven from the Garden of Eden at the ninth hour.

None was also the hour of fasting. At first, the hour of fasting was prolonged to Vespers, that is to say, food was taken only in the evening or at the end of the day. Mitigation of this rigorous practice was soon introduced. Tertullian's work De jejunio adversus psychicos ("On fasting, against the materialistic") rails at length against the Psychicos (i.e. the Orthodox Christians) who end their fast on station days at the Hour of None, while he, Tertullian, claims that he is faithful to the ancient custom. The practice of breaking the fast at None caused that hour to be selected for Mass and Communion, which were the signs of the close of the day. The distinction between the rigorous fast, which was prolonged to Vespers, and the mitigated fast, ending at None, is met with in a large number of ancient documents.

In the Roman Rite the office of None is likewise constructed after the model of the Little Hours of the day; it is composed of the same elements as in the Rule of St. Benedict, with this difference: that instead of the three psalms (125-127), the three groups of eight verses from Psalm 118 are always recited. There is nothing else characteristic of this office in this liturgy. The hymn, which was added later, is the one already in use in the Benedictine Office—Rerum Deus tenax vigor. In the monastic rules prior to the 10th century certain variations are found. Thus in the Rule of Lerins, as in that of St. Caesarius, six psalms are recited at None, as at Terce and Sext, with antiphon, hymn and capitulum.

St. Aurelian follows the same tradition in his Rule Ad virgines, but he imposes twelve psalms at each hour on the monks. St. Columbanus, St. Fructuosus, and St. Isidore adopt the system of three psalms. Like St. Benedict, most of these authors include hymns, the capitulum or short lesson, a versicle, and an oratio. In the 9th and 10th centuries we find some additions made to the Office of None, in particular litanies, collects, etc.

== Current practice ==
=== Roman Rite ===
With the reforms of the Second Vatican Council the traditional one-week Psalter cycle became a four-week cycle. Furthermore, it is only mandatory to pray one of the Little Hours (Terce, Sext, and None). In the liturgy of the hours of some religious orders Sext and None are combined to form a "midday hour". However, bishops, priests and others, "who have received from the Church the mandate to celebrate the liturgy of the hours" are still expected to recite the full sequence of hours, as closely as possible to the traditional time of day.

=== Antiochene Rites ===
==== West Syriac Rite ====
In the Maronite Church, Syriac Orthodox Church, Syriac Catholic Church, Malankara Orthodox Syrian Church, Malankara Marthoma Syrian Church, and the Syro-Malankara Catholic Church, the office of None is also known as Tsha' sho`in and is prayed at 3 pm using the Shehimo breviary.

==== Byzantine Rite ====
In the Eastern Orthodox and Greek Catholic Churches the office of the Ninth Hour is normally read by a single Reader and has very little variation in it. Three fixed psalms are read at the Ninth Hour: Psalms 83, 84, and 85 (LXX). The only variable portions for most of the year are the Troparia (either one or two) and Kontakion of the Day. The service ends with the Prayer of the Ninth Hour by Saint Basil the Great.

During Great Lent a number of changes in the office take place. On Monday through Thursday, after the three fixed psalms, the Reader says a kathisma from the Psalter. The Troparion of the Day is replaced by special Lenten hymns that are chanted with prostrations. Then a portion of the Ladder of Divine Ascent may be read. The Kontakion of the Day is replaced by special Lenten troparia. Near the end of the Hour, the Prayer of St. Ephraim is said, with prostrations.

During Holy Week, on Great Monday, Tuesday, and Wednesday, the services are similar to those during Great Lent, except that there is no kathisma, and instead of the normal Lenten hymns which replace the Kontakion, the Kontakion of the day (i.e., that day of Holy Week) is chanted. On Great Thursday and Saturday, the Little Hours are more like normal. On Great Friday, the Royal Hours are chanted.

During the Lesser Lenten seasons (Nativity Fast, Apostles' Fast and Dormition Fast) the Little Hours undergo changes similar to those during Great Lent, except the Lenten hymns are usually read instead of chanted, and there are no kathismata. In addition, on weekdays of the Lesser Fasts, an Inter-Hour (Greek: Mesorion) may be read immediately after each Hour (at least on the first day of the fast). The Inter-Hours may also be read during Great Lent if there is to be no reading from the Ladder of Divine Ascent at the Little Hours. The Inter-Hours follow the same general outline as the Little Hours, except they are shorter.

==== Armenian Rite ====
In the Armenian Liturgy, the Ninth Hour (Old Armenian: Իններորդ Ժամ, innerord zham) commemorates both the Son of God and the death and surrender of [his] rational spirit.

In the Armenian Book of Hours and in many liturgical manuscripts, the Ninth Hour concludes with a service of hymns, psalms, readings, and prayers which would normally be recited during the Patarag (Divine Liturgy or Mass).

In the Armenian Book of Hours and in many liturgical manuscripts, the ninth hour includes the service of prayers, hymns, and Bible readings which would normally take place at the Patarag (Divine Liturgy or Mass), without the prayers of the eucharistic canon (preparation, consecration, post-communion prayers) and many of the litanies. There is no separate heading for this service as there is for the other services in the Book of Hours. Still, this is a distinct service because the concluding “Our Father” which ends every Armenian liturgy, including all of the liturgies of the hours, also occurs at the end of the Ninth Hour proper in analogy to the First, Third, and Sixth hours, and before this additional service.

This service may be called the Chash Service (Old Armenian: Ճաշու Պաշտաւն chashou pashtawn), the service of mealtime, which was taken at the end of the day at the conclusion of work, which would have been after the ninth hour. Since fasting before communion was the rule in the ancient church, the ninth hour suggested itself as the appropriate time to offer the Patarag. Thus, a service which contained the readings and much of the prayers from the Patarag was added after the Ninth Hour for those days when no Patarag would be celebrated.

One can compare this Chash service to the Typica service celebrated in churches belonging to the Slavic tradition within the Byzantine liturgical rite. Not all ancient manuscripts of the Armenian hours have this service, therefore it is unclear whether this service is a later importation from the Byzantine liturgy, with the words and sequence of the Armenian Patarag substituted for those of the Byzantine Divine Liturgy.

===== Outline of the Service =====
Introduction: “Blessed is our Lord Jesus Christ. Amen. Our Father...”; “Blessed is the Holy Father, true God. Amen.”

Psalm 51: “Have mercy on me...”; “Glory...Now and always...Amen.”; Hymn of the Ninth Hour: “The light of day suffered with you... (Ch`arch`areal k`ez tiw lousoy...)”; Exhortation: “At every hour this is my prayer...(Amenayn zhamou...)”; Proclamation: “Again and again in peace...”; Prayer: “Blessing and Glory to the Father...Now and always...Amen.”

During the Great Fast: The Prayer of John Mandakouni “With a holy heart... (Sourb srtiw...)”; Proclamation: “That we may pass this hour...(Zzhams ev zarajakay...)”

Otherwise continue here:

Prayer: “Lord of hosts...(Tēr zawrout`eants`...)”

Psalm (Daniel 3:33-34): “Lord, do not forsake us...(Tēr mi matner zmez...)”; Hymn of St. Nerses (Tone 3): “Accept, Lord, the request of the patriarch Abraham...(Nahapetin...)”; Proclamation: “Let us beseech our lifegiving savior, Christ,...(Aghach`ests`ouk` zkensatou...)”; Prayer, “Having fallen down before you...(Ankeal araji k`o...)”; Prayer of Sarkawag Vardapet: “Remember, Lord your servants... (Hishea...)”; Prayer: “God, beneficent and full of mercy...(Barerar ev bazoumoghorm Astouats...)”

Psalm 116 “I loved, because the Lord heard...(Sirets'i zi lowits`ē Tēr ztzayn...)”; Psalm 117 “Bless the Lord all nations...(Awrhnets`ēk` zTēr amenayn azink`...)”; “Glory to the Father...Now and always...Amen.”

On dominical feasts and the commemorations of martyrs: Hymn (varies according to the tone of the day)

Otherwise continue here:

Exhortation: “For the souls at rest...(Hogwots`n hangouts`elots`...)”; Proclamation: “Again and again in peace...For the souls...(Vasn hangsteal hogwots`n...)”; “Lord, have mercy” (thrice); Prayer: “Christ, Son of God,...(K`ristos, Ordi Astoutsoy...)” (on fasting days, said thrice); “Blessed is our Lord Jesus Christ. Amen. Our Father...”

The Chashou Service

Exhortation: “Our psalmody and our supplications...(Zsaghmosergout`iwns ev zaghach`ans mer...)”; “Amen.”

“Blessed is the kingdom of the Father...Now and always...Amen.”

Hymn of the Time of Entrance (Ժամամուտ zhamamout; varies for the tone, commemoration, and liturgical season)

Song of the Time of Entrance (Ժամերգութիւն zhamergout`iwn; varies)

Proclamation: “Again and again in peace...accept, vivify, and have mercy.”; “Blessing and glory to the Father...Now and ever...Amen.”

Chashou Antiphon (varies)

Chashou Hymn (varies)

Holy God (varies)

Proclamation: “Again and again...For the peace of the whole world...(Vasn khaghaghoutean...)”; Prayer: “For you are the merciful and philanthropic God...(Zi oghormats ev mardasēr...)”

Chashou Psalm (varies)

Reading from the Apostles (varies)

Chashou Canticle (varies)

Reading from the Prophets (varies)

Chasou Alleluia (varies)

Pre-Gospel sequence

Gospel (varies)

“Glory to you, Lord, our God.”

Nicean Symbol: “We believe in one God...”; “As for those who say...(Isk ork` asen...)”; “As for us, let us glorify...(Isk mek` p`araworests`ouk`...)

Proclamation: “Again and again...And again with faith...(Ev evs havatov...); Prayer: “Our Lord and savior...(Tēr mer ev p'rkich'...)”; “Peace be with all.”; “Let us bow down before God.”; Prayer: “By your peace...(Khaghaghout`eamb k`ov...)”; “Blessed is our Lord Jesus Christ.”; “May the Lord God bless everyone. Amen.”; “Our Father...”

“One is Holy. One is Lord, Jesus Christ, to the glory of God the Father. Amen.”; “Blessed is the Holy Father, true God. Amen.”; “Blessed is the Holy Son, true God. Amen.”; “Blessed is the Holy Spirit, true God. Amen.”; “Holy Father, Holy Son, Holy Spirit.”

“Blessing and glory to the Father...Now and always...Amen.”; “Blessed be the name of the Lord now and forever.” (thrice); “Blessed is God. You are the fulfillment of the Law and the Prophets...”

“I shall bless the Lord at all times, at every hour his blessing upon my lips.”

“Be blessed by the grace of the Holy Spirit. Go in peace, and may the Lord be with you and with everyone. Amen.”

=== Alexandrian Rite ===
In the Coptic Orthodox Church, and Coptic Catholic Church, the Ninth Hour is prayed at 3 pm using the Agpeya breviary.

=== East Syriac Rite ===
The equivalent of None in the East Syriac Rite, employed by the Chaldean Catholic Church, Syro-Malabar Church, Assyrian Church of the East and Ancient Church of the East is D-Bathsha Shayin.

== See also ==
- Canonical Hours
