= Ladder of Divine Ascent (icon) =

12th-century Christian icon

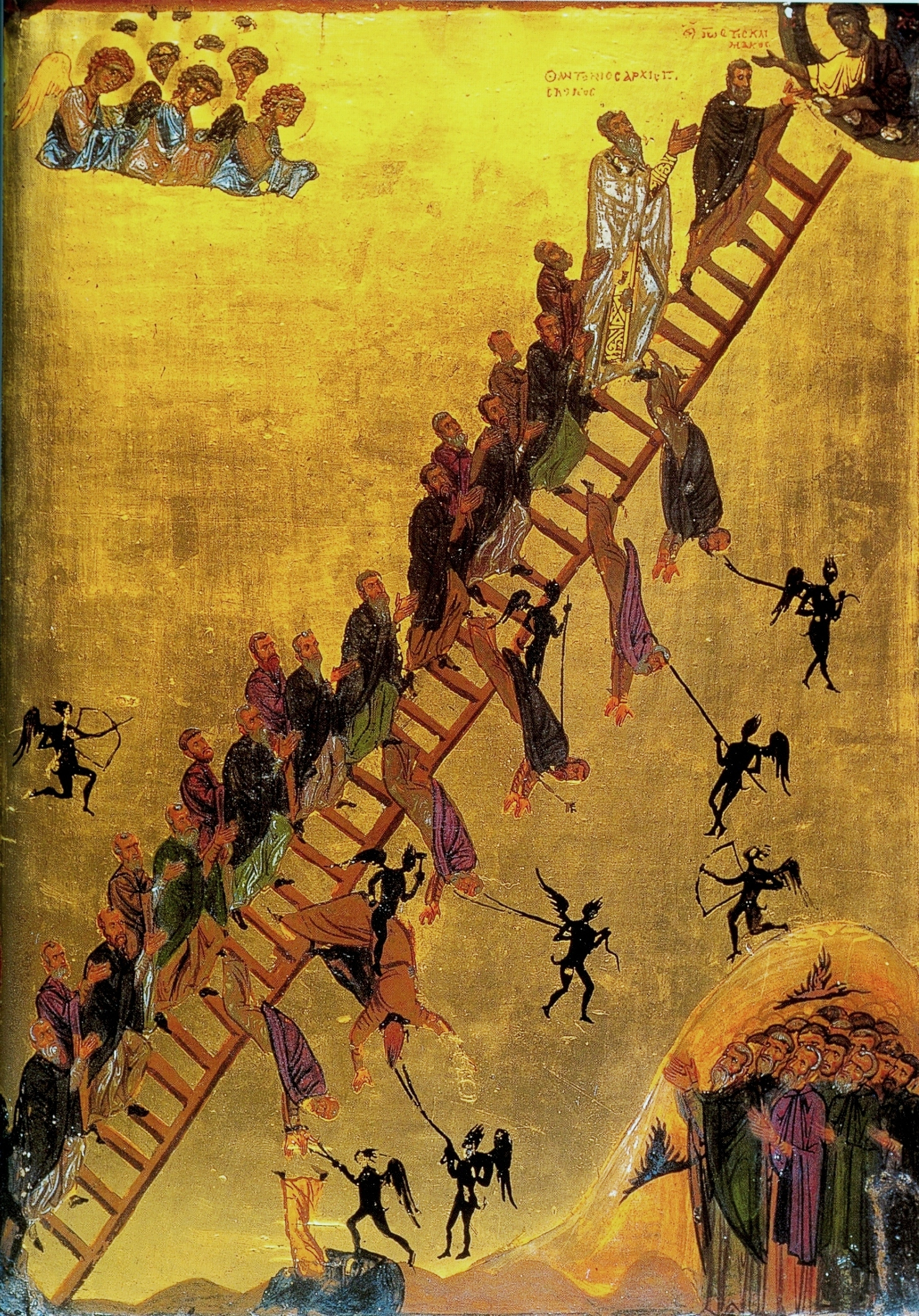
The Ladder of Divine Ascent, Saint Catherine's Monastery

The Ladder of Divine Ascent is a late-12th-century Christian icon in the monastery of Saint Catherine, located at the foot of Mount Sinai in Egypt.

== Description ==
The icon represents the theological teachings of John Climacus, also known as John of the Ladder, as represented in the ascetical treatise The Ladder of Divine Ascent, written c. AD 600. The treatise has been influential in Eastern Christianity.

The icon depicts monks ascending the ladder towards Jesus in Heaven, at the top right of the image with John Climacus at the top of the ladder, being welcomed by Jesus. The ladder has 30 rungs representing the 30 stages of ascetic life.

The ascent of the monks is assisted by the prayers of angels, saints and the community, while demons attack and try to make monks fall from the ladder by pulling them down or striking them with arrows. The depiction of the ladder reflects the importance of angels and demons in Eastern Orthodox spirituality. The icon also shows a gaping maw, representing the Devil himself who is devouring a monk who has fallen from the ladder.

The ladder shows some monks who have almost reached the summit as being tempted by demons and falling. The depiction of the monks falling off is a reflection of what John Climacus expressed as "what never ceased to amaze him" namely why some monks still gave in to worldly passions when God, the angels and the saints were encouraging them towards virtue.

== See also ==
- Ladder of Divine Ascent (Tzanes)
