= Nunc Sancte nobis Spiritus =

Nunc, Sancte, nobis Spiritus is a Christian hymn which has traditionally been attributed to the fourth century St. Ambrose of Milan. However the earliest manuscript tradition for the hymn seems to only go back to the ninth century. The hymn has traditionally been a core part of the prayers at Terce in the Liturgy of the Hours. The reason for this is that the Acts of the Apostles records an event at Pentecost where the apostles are filled with the Holy Spirit. The experience clearly causes the apostles to behave in an unusual way and in chapter 2 verse 15 the Acts of the Apostles states explicitly that the apostles were not drunk because it was only the third hour of the day (ie 9 am). As the Acts of the Apostles was so explicit in linking the Pentecost experience of the Apostles to the third hour of the day, Christian hymns and prayers intended to be used at that time of the day, have traditionally made reference to the coming of the Holy Spirit.

== Hymn in Latin ==
Latin text	Literal translation
Nunc, Sancte, nobis, Spiritus, Unum Patri cum Filio, Dignare promptus ingeri Nostro refusus pectori. Os, lingua, mens, sensus, vigor Confessionem personent. Flammescat igne caritas, Accéndat ardor proximos. Præsta, Pater piissime, Patríque compar Unice, Cum Spiritu Paraclito Regnans per omne sæculum. Amen. Alternative ending Per te sciamus da Patrem noscamus atque Filium te utriusque Spiritum credamus omni tempore. Amen	Now, O Holy Spirit (given) for us One with the Father (and) the Son condescend to enter [us] at once (you) having been poured into our breasts Let mouth, tongue, mind, sense, activity Sound out (our) profession Let (our) charity burn with fire Let (our) ardour burn for our neighbours Grant, most holy Father (and grant) Oh only (Son) equal to the Father with the Spirit, the Paraclete, ruling through all ages. Amen Alternative ending Through you may we know the Father and Let us know also the Son and You the Spirit of them both may we believe for all time. Amen

When used as a hymn, typically only three verses are used. The first three verses represent the version of the hymn which is generally used in the Roman Office, where the final verse is designed to be the same across a number of different hymns.

The Plain Chant melodies used with the Latin version of the hymn changes according to the seasons in the Liturgical Year. The different melodies can be found on the Liber Hymnarius website.

== English translations ==
Translation by John Henry Newman, 1836	Translation by John Mason Neale, 1852
Come, Holy Ghost, Who ever One Art with the Father and the Son; Come, Holy Ghost, our souls possess With Thy full flood of holiness. In will and deed, by heart and tongue, With all our powers, Thy praise be sung; And love light up our mortal frame, Till others catch the living flame. Almighty Father, hear our cry Through Jesus Christ our Lord most high, Who with the Holy Ghost and Thee Doth live and reign eternally.	Come, Holy Ghost, with God the Son And God the Father, ever One; Shed forth Thy grace within our breast, And dwell with us a ready Guest. By every power, by heart and tongue, By act and deed, Thy praise be sung; Inflame with perfect love each sense, That others’ souls may kindle thence. O Father, that we ask be done, Through Jesus Christ, Thine only Son, Who, with the Holy Ghost and Thee, Shall live and reign eternally.

== See also ==
- Ambrosian hymnography
- Christian liturgy
- Gregorian Chant
- Little Hours
- Liturgy of the Hours
- Plainsong
- Terce
