= Sext =

Midday canonical hour in the liturgy

Sext at Vadstena Abbey Church (Evangelical-Lutheran) in Sweden

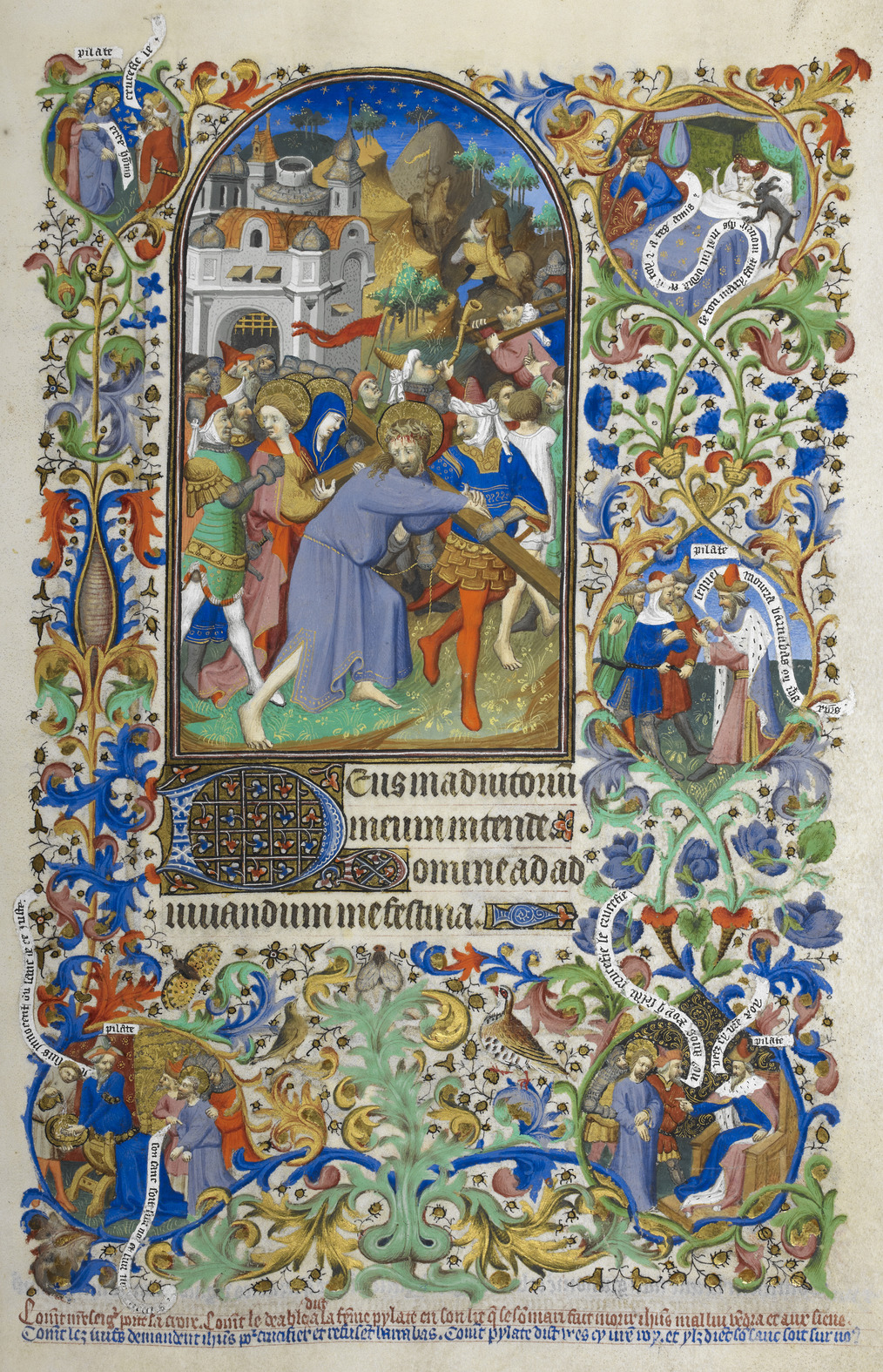
Hours of the Passion [Sext]. Christ carrying the cross. Decorated borders with marginal scenes including the dream of Pilate's wife, the reprieve of Barabbas and Pilate washing his hands

Sext is a canonical hour of the Divine Office in the liturgies of many Christian denominations. It consists mainly of psalms and is held around noon. Its name comes from Latin and refers to the sixth hour of the day after dawn. With Terce, None and Compline it belongs to the so-called Little Hours.

In Oriental Orthodox Christianity and Oriental Protestant Christianity, the office is prayed at 12 pm, being known as Sheth sho`in in the Syriac and Indian traditions; it is prayed facing the eastward direction of prayer by all members in these denominations, both clergy and laity, being one of the seven fixed prayer times.

== History ==
The hora sexta of the Romans corresponded closely with our noon. Among the Jews it was already regarded, together with Terce and None, as an hour most favourable to prayer. The Acts of the Apostles state that St. Peter went up to the higher parts of the house to pray (Acts 10:9). It was the middle of the day, also the usual hour of rest, and in consequence for devout men, an occasion to pray to God, as were the morning and evening hours.

From the time of the early Church, the practice of seven fixed prayer times have been taught; in Apostolic Tradition, Hippolytus instructed Christians to pray seven times a day "on rising, at the lighting of the evening lamp, at bedtime, at midnight" and "the third, sixth and ninth hours of the day, being hours associated with Christ's Passion." With respect to sixth hour prayer, Hippolytus wrote:

Pray also at the sixth hour. Because when Christ was attached to the wood of the cross, the daylight ceased and became darkness. Thus you should pray a powerful prayer at this hour, imitating the cry of him who prayed and all creation was made dark...

The Fathers of the Church dwell constantly on the symbolism of this hour. Noon is the hour when the sun is at its full, it is the image of Divine splendour, the plenitude of God, the time of grace; at the sixth hour Abraham received the three angels. We should pray at noon, says St. Ambrose, because that is the time when the Divine light is in its fullness. Origen, St. Augustine, and several others regard this hour as favourable to prayer. Lastly and above all, it was the hour when Christ was nailed to the Cross; this memory excelling all the others left a still visible trace in most of the liturgy of this hour. This scene from Good Friday is the background for Sext. "Lead us not into temptation" is the message of this hour. It is also a time to ask God to grant one health and peace of heart, as in the traditional hymn Rector Potens.

All these reasons and traditions, which indicate the sixth hour as a culminating point in the day, a sort of pause in the life of affairs, the hour of repast, could not but exercise an influence on Christians, inducing them to choose it as an hour of prayer. As early as the third century the hour of Sext was considered as important as Terce and None as an hour of prayer. The Didache, Clement of Alexandria, and Tertullian all speak of these three hours of prayer. Origen, the "Canons of Hippolytus", and St. Cyprian express the same tradition. It is therefore evident that the custom of prayer at the sixth hour was well established by the 3rd century. But probably most of these texts refer to private prayer.

In the 4th century the hour of Sext was widely established as a Canonical Hour. In his rule St. Basil made the sixth hour an hour of prayer for the monks. St. John Cassian treats it as an hour of prayer generally recognized in his monasteries. But this does not mean that the observance of Sext, any more than Prime, Terce, None, or even the other Canonical Hours, was universal. Discipline on this point varied widely according to regions and Churches.

== Western Office ==
Despite its antiquity the hour of Sext never had the importance of those of Matins, Lauds, and Vespers. It must have been of short duration. In the fourth and the following centuries the texts which speak of the compositions of this Office are far from uniform. John Cassian tells us that in Palestine three psalms were recited for Sext, as also for Terce and None. This number was adopted by the Rules of St. Benedict, St. Columbanus, St. Isidore, St. Fructuosus, and to a certain extent by the Roman Church. However, Cassian says that in some provinces three psalms were said at Terce, six at Sext, and nine at None. Others recited six psalms at each hour and this custom became general among the Gauls.

In the sixth century the Rule of St. Benedict gives the detailed composition of this Office. Sext, like Terce and None, was composed at most of three psalms, of which the choice was fixed, the Deus in adjutorium, a hymn, a lesson (capitulum), a versicle, the Kyrie Eleison, and the customary concluding prayer and dismissal. One of the most common hymns used at Sext is Rector Potens, Verax Deus.

The term siesta derives from the canonical hour Sext. The practice developed from a Benedictine institution which provided that between the hours of Sext and None, the monks were allowed a nap to catch up on the sleep lost while chanting the night hours.

Terce, Sext and None have an identical structure, each with three psalms or portions of psalms. These are followed by a short reading from Scripture, once referred to as a “little chapter” (capitulum), and by a versicle and response. The Lesser Litany (Kyrie and the Lord's Prayer) of Pius X's arrangement have now been omitted. In monastic life it is seen as a time for refreshment, reflection, and renewal.

The 1979 Book of Common Prayer's Order of Service for Noonday is based upon the traditional structure of the Little Offices. In the Episcopal monastic tradition, diurnum is a name for the midday service of the Divine Office, which is usually the second of four services. It is alternatively known as Sext.

== Oriental Christianity ==
=== Syriac Orthodox Church, Indian Orthodox Church and Mar Thoma Syrian Church ===
In the Syriac Orthodox Church and Indian Orthodox Church (both of which are Oriental Orthodox Churches), as well as the Mar Thoma Syrian Church (an Oriental Protestant denomination), Sext is known as Sheth sho`in and is prayed at 12 pm using the Shehimo breviary.

=== Coptic Orthodox Church of Alexandria ===
In the Coptic Orthodox Church, an Oriental Orthodox denomination, the Sext is prayed at 12 pm using the Agpeya breviary.

=== Armenian Liturgy ===
The six hour in the Armenian Liturgy commemorates God the Father, and the sufferings and crucifixion of the Son of God.

Outline of the Service

Introduction: “Blessed is our Lord Jesus Christ. Amen. Our Father...”; “Blessed is the Holy Father, true God. Amen.”

Psalm 51: “Have mercy on me...”; “Glory...Now and always...Amen.”; Hymn of the Sixth Hour: “The light of the sun was darkened... (Khawarets`aw lo3sn arewoum...)”; Exhortation: “At every hour this is my prayer...(Amenayn zhamou...)”; Proclamation: “Again and again in peace...”; Prayer: “Blessing and Glory to the Father...Now and always...Amen.”

During the Great Fast: The Prayer of John Mandakouni “With a sober mind... (Art`own mtawk`...)”; Proclamation: “That we may pass this hour...(Zzhams ev zarajakay...)”

Otherwise continue here: Prayer: “Clothe us...(Zgets`o mez...)”

Psalm 79:8-9: “Do not remember...(mi yishea...)”; Proclamation: “For the sick...(Vasn hiwantats`...)”; Prayer, “Assuage the pains...(P`aratea zts`aws...)”; Prayer of Sarkawag Vardapet: “Remember, Lord your servants... (Hishea...)”; Prayer: “God, beneficent and full of mercy...(Barerar ev bazoumoghorm Astouats...)”

Psalm 41:1-4: “Blessed the one who considers...(Erani or khorhi...)”; Psalm 91: “The one who dwells in the most high...(Or bnakeanln...)” “Glory to the Father...Now and always...Amen.”; Proclamation: “Again and again in peace...Let us ask with faith...(Khndrests`ouk` havatov...)”; Prayer: “Father of mercies...(Hayr gt`out`eants`...)”

Then they said the prayer of Ephrem the Syrian with prostrations.

“Blessed is our Lord Jesus Christ. Amen. Our Father...”

== Eastern Christian Office ==
In the Eastern Orthodox and Greek Catholic Churches the office of the Sixth Hour is normally read by a single Reader and has very little variation in it. Three fixed psalms are read at the Sixth Hour: Psalms 53, 54 and 90 (LXX). The only variable portions for most of the year are the Troparia (either one or two) and Kontakion of the Day.

During Great Lent a number of changes in the office take place. On Monday through Friday, after the three fixed psalms, the Reader says a kathisma from the Psalter. The Troparion of the Day is replaced by special Lenten hymns that are chanted with prostrations. Then, a special Troparion of the Prophecy is chanted, which is particular to that specific day of Great Lent. This is followed by a Prokeimenon, a reading from Isaiah and another Prokeimenon. Then there may follow a reading from the Ladder of Divine Ascent. The Kontakion of the Day is replaced by special Lenten troparia. Near the end of the Hour, the Prayer of St. Ephraim is said, with prostrations.

During Holy Week, on Great Monday, Tuesday and Wednesday, the services are similar to those during Great Lent (including the reading of a kathisma), but instead of the normal Lenten hymns which replace the Kontakion, the Kontakion of the day (i.e., that day of Holy Week) is chanted. On Great Thursday and Saturday, the Little Hours are more like normal. On Great Friday, the Royal Hours are chanted.

During the Lesser Lenten seasons (Nativity Fast, Apostles' Fast and Dormition Fast) the Little Hours undergo changes similar to those during Great Lent, except the Lenten hymns are usually read instead of chanted, and there are no kathismata. In addition, on weekdays of the Lesser Fasts, an Inter-Hour (Greek: Mesorion) may be read immediately after each Hour (at least on the first day of the Fast). The Inter-Hours may also be read during Great Lent if there is to be no reading from the Ladder of Divine Ascent at the Little Hours. The Inter-Hours follow the same general outline as the Little Hours, except they are shorter.

== See also ==
- Canonical Hours
