= Terce =

Midmorning canonical hour of the liturgy

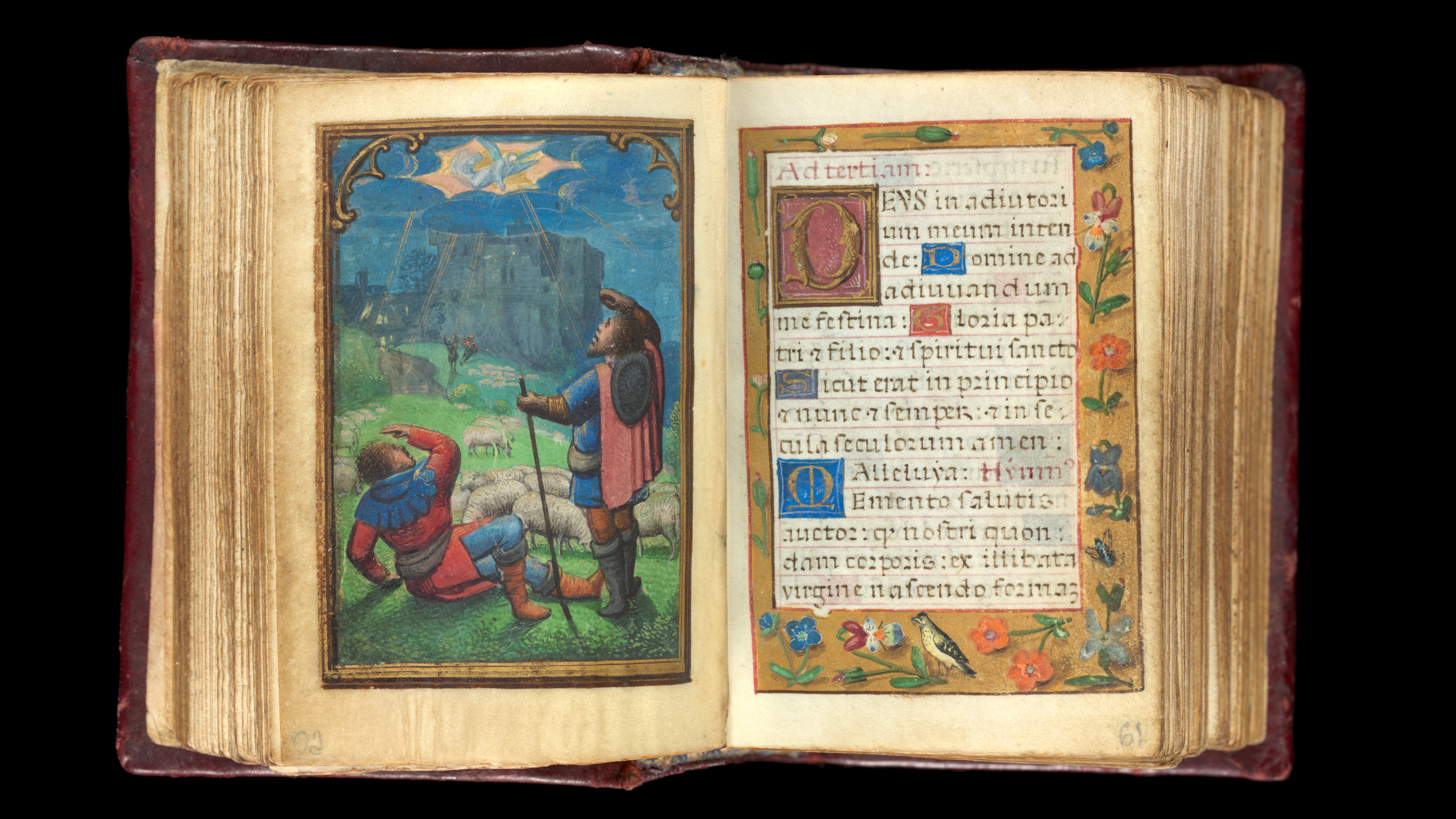
Nederlandish book of the hours, opened at the hour of Terce

Terce is a canonical hour of the Divine Office. It consists mainly of psalms and is held around 9 a.m. Its name comes from Latin and refers to the third hour of the day after dawn. Along with Prime, Sext, None, and Compline, Terce belongs to the so-called "Little Hours".

== Origin ==
From the time of the early Church, the practice of seven fixed prayer times have been taught; in Apostolic Tradition, Hippolytus instructed Christians to pray seven times a day "on rising, at the lighting of the evening lamp, at bedtime, at midnight" and "the third, sixth and ninth hours of the day, being hours associated with Christ's Passion." This practice of seven fixed prayer times continues today in many Christian denominations.

The origin of Terce, like that of Sext and None, to which it bears a close relationship, dates back to Apostolic times. According to an ancient custom of the Romans and Greeks, the day and night respectively were divided into four parts of about three hours each. The second division of the day contained the hours from about the modern nine o'clock until about midday; using the Roman numbering the hour just preceding this division was called hora tertia (the third hour) from which the word terce is derived. Since the Roman day was divided into twelve hours from sunrise to sunset regardless of day length, the timing for hora tertia depended on the latitude and day of year. At Rome's latitude hora tertia was in modern terms 09:02 to 09:46 solar time at the winter solstice, but at the summer solstice it was 06:58 to 08:13.

These divisions of the day were also used by the Jews at the time of Christ. The New Testament mentions the sixth hour in Matthew 20:5, and the ninth hour in Matthew 27:46. The Holy Ghost descends upon the Apostles on the day of Pentecost at the third hour, Acts 2:15. Some of these texts prove that these three hours were, in preference to others, chosen for prayer by the Christians, and probably also by the Jews, from whom the Christians appear to have borrowed the custom.

== Development ==
The Fathers of the Church and the ecclesiastical writers of the third century frequently mention Terce, Sext, and None as hours for daily prayers. Tertullian, around the year 200, recommended, in addition to the obligatory morning and evening prayers, the use of the third, sixth and ninth hours of daylight to remind oneself to pray.

Clement of Alexandria and Tertullian refer only to private prayer at these three hours. The Canons of Hippolytus also speak of these three hours as suitable for private prayer. However, on the days called "days of station", that is to say Wednesday and Friday, which were set apart as especially consecrated to prayer, and Sunday, these hours were recited in public. Cyprian remarked that these three hours had been observed in the Old Testament, and that Christians should also observe them. In the fourth century the custom of praying at these hours became more frequent, and even obligatory, at least for monks. The elements of the prayer of Terce, Sext, or None before the fourth century probably consisted of psalms, canticles, hymns, and litanies.

Jerome said, "... we must set aside stated hours for the duty of praying. Then, should any occupation keep us away from it, the hour itself will remind us of that duty. As such prayer times everyone knows of the third, sixth and ninth hours, the morning and the evening hours." Sources from the fourth century onwards offer a more precise picture of the composition of the hour of Terce. Most of John Cassian's Institutes III.3 is an exegetical justification for the offices of Terce, Sext, and None, in which he relates each hour to a scriptural passage in which an important event occurs at that hour. In this way, by directing the monks to scripture, the hours acquired an educational benefit. This was also the view held in Ireland, where the psalms selected for Terce focused on the glorification of the risen Christ.

It seems there was no universal practice of the communal recitation of these hours until the Middle Ages. On Sundays, Terce was sung in organum before the principal Mass, and included the hymn Nunc sancte nobis spiritus, which recalls the descent of the Holy Ghost upon the Apostles. In the monastery of Lerins, work commenced after Terce and continued until Nones. The custom of Little Hours grew up in the monastic and larger Church in the course of the centuries and still is followed in stricter monasteries and hermitages. These hours also continue to be prayed by many religious communities.

Terce, Sext and None have an identical structure, each with three psalms or portions of psalms. These are followed by a short reading from Scripture, once referred to as a "little chapter" (capitulum), and by a versicle and response. The Lesser Litany (Kyrie and the Lord's Prayer) of Pius X's arrangement have now been omitted.

The 1979 Anglican Order of Service for Noonday is based upon the traditional structure of the Little Offices.

== Symbolism ==
The purpose of the "Little Hours" sanctify the day by pausing in the midst of their work and dedicate various moments to prayer throughout the course of the day. The time of day for Terce is associated with the descent of the Holy Spirit upon the apostles on the day of Pentecost "seeing it is but the third hour of the day" (Acts 2:15). The Hour's general theme is therefore, the invocation of the Holy Spirit, and invokes the Holy Spirit for strength in dealing with the conflicts of the day. "It is a 'Come, Holy Spirit' upon the day's work."

== Oriental Christian usages ==
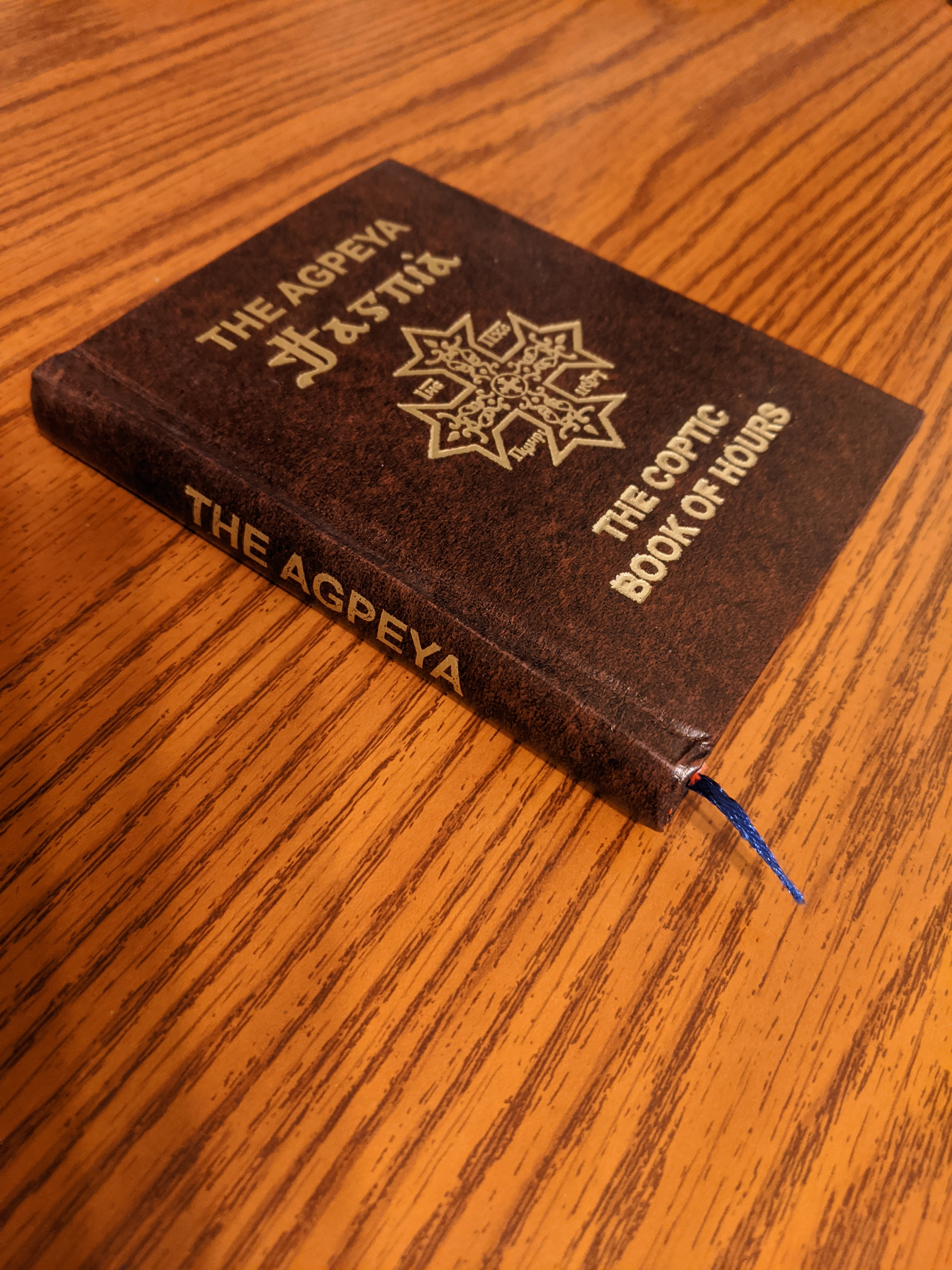
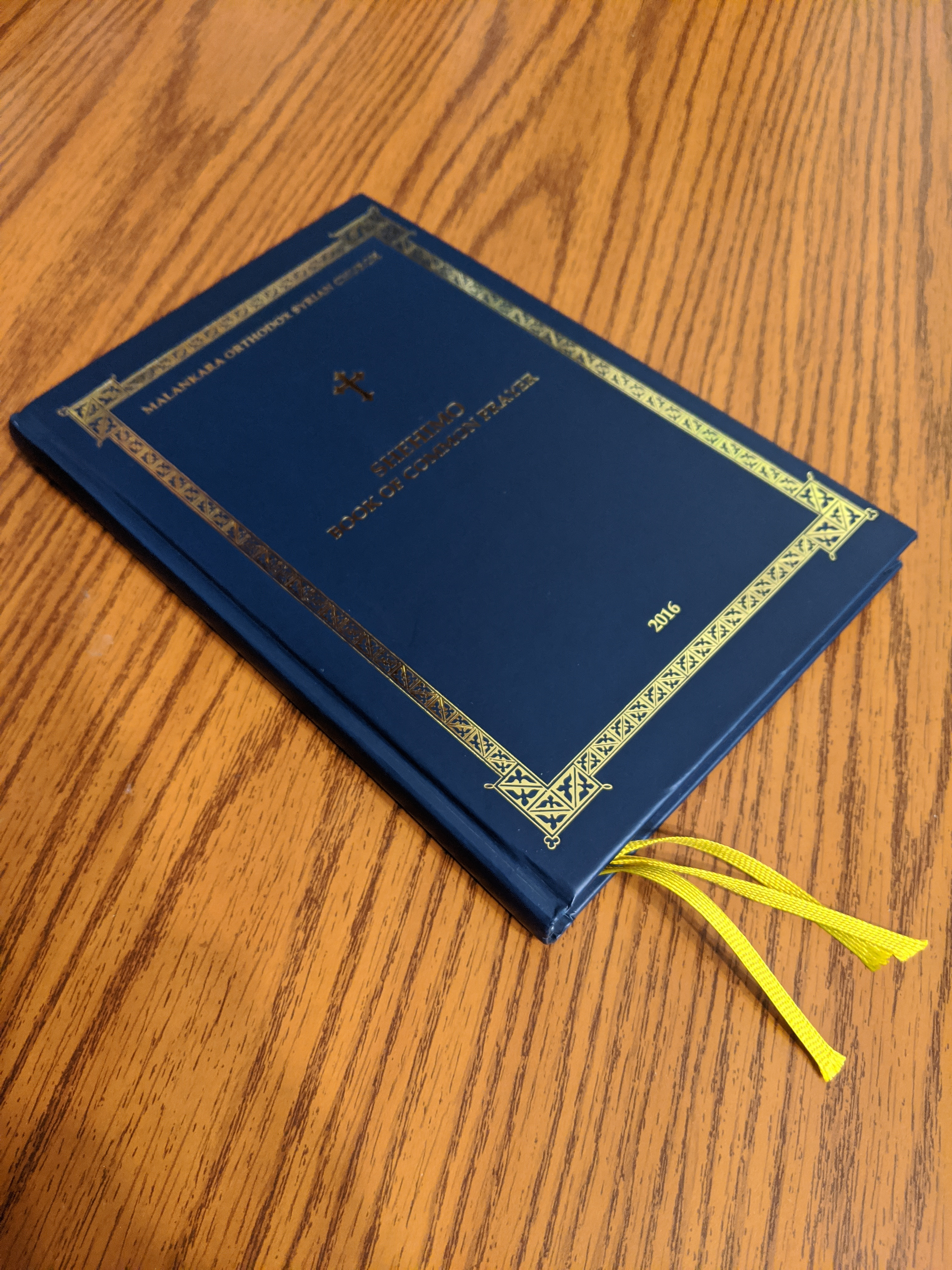
The Agpeya and Shehimo are breviaries used in Oriental Christianity to pray the canonical hours at seven fixed times of the day in the eastward direction.

=== Syriac Orthodox Church, Indian Orthodox Church and Mar Thoma Syrian Church ===
In the Syriac Orthodox Church and Indian Orthodox Church, as well as the Mar Thoma Syrian Church (an Oriental Protestant denomination), the office of Terce is also known as Tloth sho`in and is prayed at 9 am using the Shehimo breviary.

=== Coptic Orthodox Church of Alexandria ===
In the Coptic Orthodox Church, an Oriental Orthodox denomination, the office of Terce is prayed at 9 am using the Agpeya breviary.

=== Armenian Liturgy ===
In the Armenian Book of Hours (Armenian: Ժամագիրք zhamagirk`) the Third Hour (Armenian Երրորդ Ժամ errord zham) is a short service with minimal changes depending on the liturgical season. It is celebrated "in commemoration of the descent of the Holy Spirit, and in commemoration of the First Mother's (i.e., Eve's) tasting [of the fruit of the tree at the center of the Garden], and of the liberation [of humanity] through Christ."

Outline of the Third Hour

Introduction: "Blessed is our Lord Jesus Christ. Amen. Our Father..."; "Blessed is the Holy Spirit, true God. Amen."

Psalm 51: "Have mercy on me..."; "Glory...Now and always...Amen."; Hymn of the Third Hour: "We bless you, unoriginate Father... (Awhrnets`emk` zk`ez Hayr anskizbn...)"; Exhortation: "At every hour may my prayer be this...(Amenayn zhamou...)"

During the Great Fast: The Prayer of John Mandakouni "Unanimously let everyone give thanks... (Miaban amenek`ean gohats`arouk`...)"

Otherwise continue here: Prayer: "You who repose on the cherubic throne...(Or i k`rovpēakan...)"

Psalm 68:19-21: "Blessed is God..."; Proclamation: "Let us beseech the Lord in faith...(Khndrests`ouk` havatov...)"; Prayer, "Guide us...(Arajnordea mez...)"; Prayer of Sarkawag Vardapet: "Remember, Lord your servants... (Hishea...)"; Prayer: "God, beneficent and full of mercy...(Barerar ev bazoumoghorm Astouats...)"

Psalm 23: "The Lord will shepherd me..."; Psalm 143:9-12: "Show me the way..."; "Glory to the Father...Now and always...Amen."; Proclamation: "Again and again in peace...Let us with thanksgiving pray...(Gohabanelov...)"; Prayer: "Through your peace...(Khaghaghout`eamb k`ov...)"; "Blessed is our Lord Jesus Christ. Amen. Our Father..."

== Eastern Christian Office ==
In the Eastern Orthodox and Greek Catholic Churches, the office of the Third Hour is normally read by a single Reader and has very little variation in it. Three fixed psalms are read at the Third Hour: Psalms 16, 24, and 50 (LXX). The only variable portions for most of the year are the Troparia (either one or two) and Kontakion of the Day.

During Great Lent a number of changes in the office take place. On Monday through Friday, after the three fixed psalms, the Reader says a kathisma from the Psalter. The Troparion of the Day is replaced by special Lenten hymns that are chanted with prostrations. Then a portion of the Ladder of Divine Ascent may be read. The Kontakion of the Day is replaced by special Lenten troparia. Near the end of the Hour, the Prayer of St. Ephraim is said, with prostrations.

During Holy Week, on Great Monday, Tuesday and Wednesday, the services are similar to those during Great Lent (including the reading of a kathisma), but instead of the normal Lenten hymns which replace the Kontakion, the Kontakion of the day (i.e., that day of Holy Week) is chanted. On Great Thursday and Saturday, the Little Hours are more like normal. On Great Friday, the Royal Hours are chanted.

During the Lesser Lenten seasons (Nativity Fast, Apostles' Fast and Dormition Fast) the Little Hours undergo changes similar to those during Great Lent, except the Lenten hymns are usually read instead of chanted, and there are no kathismata. In addition, on weekdays of the Lesser Fasts, an Inter-Hour (Greek: Mesorion) may be read immediately after each Hour (at least on the first day of the Fast). The Inter-Hours follow the same general outline as the Little Hours, except they are shorter.

== See also ==
- Breviary
- Canonical Hours
- Christian liturgy
- Gregorian Chant
- Hygiene in Christianity
- Little Hours
- Liturgy of the Hours
- Nunc sancte nobis spiritus
- Plainsong
