= John Climacus =

6th–7th-century Christian monk

Saint John Climacus
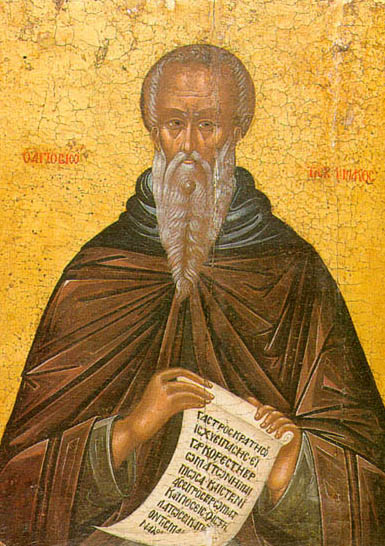
- 16th-century Greek icon of St. John Climacus
- Born: c. 579 AD; Syria, Byzantine Empire
- Died: March 649 (aged 69–70); Mount Sinai, Rashidun Caliphate
- Venerated in: Catholic Church; Eastern Orthodox Church
- Feast: 30 March, Fourth Sunday of Great Lent
- Attributes: Clothed as a monk, sometimes with an Abbot's paterissa (crozier), sometimes holding a copy of his Ladder
- Major works: The Ladder of Divine Ascent

John Climacus (Ancient Greek: Ἰωάννης τῆς Κλίμακος; Latin: Ioannes Climacus; Arabic: يوحنا السلمي, romanized: Yuḥana al-Sêlmi; c. 579 – 649), also known as John of the Ladder, John Scholasticus and John Sinaites, was a 6th–7th century Christian monk at the monastery on Mount Sinai. He is revered as a saint by the Eastern Orthodox Church and Catholic Church.

== History ==
Few details on his life are known. There exists an ancient vita (life) of the saint by a monk named Daniel of the Raithu monastery, which is the principal source about the life of John. Daniel, though claiming to be a contemporary, admits to no knowledge of John's origins—any detail on John's birth is the result of much later speculation, and is confined to references in the Menologion. Daniel also does not provide any chronology and his knowledge of the life of John is both scanty and vague. If Daniel's Life is trustworthy (there is nothing against which to judge its accuracy), then John came to the Vatos Monastery at Mount Sinai, now Saint Catherine's Monastery, and became a novice when he was about 16 years old. He was taught about the spiritual life by the more senior monk, Martyrius. After the death of Martyrius, John, wishing to practice greater asceticism, withdrew to a hermitage at the foot of the mountain. In this isolation he lived for some twenty years, constantly studying the lives of the saints and thus becoming one of the most learned Church Fathers.

In the meantime, the above tradition has been proven to be historically implausible. The artful rhetorical figures in his writings, as well as philosophical forms of thought indicate a solid academic education, as was customary for a profession in administration and law during his epoch. Such training could not have been acquired in Sinai.

Furthermore, biographical observations indicate that he probably lived by the sea, probably in Gaza, and apparently practiced Law there. It was only after his wife's death, in his early forties, that he entered the Sinai Monastery. These findings also explain the horizon and the literary quality of his writings, which have a clear philosophical background. The legend of his renunciation of the world at the age of 16, found also in other biographies of saints, is to suggest his having been untouched by secular education. Blurred deliberately would have been any roots in theological and philosophical educational traditions.

When he was about 65 years of age, the monks of Sinai persuaded him to become their hegumen. He acquitted himself of his functions as abbot.

Of John's literary output, we know only the Κλῖμαξ (Latin: Scala Paradisi) or The Ladder of Divine Ascent. This was composed in the early 7th century at the request of John, Abbot of Raithu, a monastery situated on the shores of the Red Sea. Also surviving to the present day is a shorter work To the Pastor (Latin: Liber ad Pastorem), most likely a sort of appendix to the Ladder. It is in the Ladder that we hear of the ascetic practice of carrying a small notebook to record the monk's thoughts during contemplation.

The Ladder describes how to raise one's soul and body to God through the acquisition of ascetic virtues. Climacus uses the analogy of Jacob's Ladder as the framework for his spiritual teaching. Each chapter is referred to as a "step", and deals with a separate spiritual subject. There are thirty Steps of the ladder, which correspond to the age of Jesus at his baptism and the beginning of his earthly ministry. Within the general framework of a 'ladder', Climacus' book falls into three sections. The first seven Steps concern general virtues necessary for the ascetic life, while the next nineteen (Steps 8–26) give instruction on overcoming vices and building their corresponding virtues. The final four Steps concern the higher virtues toward which the ascetic life aims. The final rung of the ladder—beyond prayer (προσευχή), stillness (ἡσυχία), and even dispassion (ἀπάθεια)—is love (ἀγάπη).

Originally written simply for the monks of a neighbouring monastery, the Ladder swiftly became one of the most widely read and much-beloved books of Byzantine spirituality. This book remains one of the most widely read among Orthodox Christians, especially during the season of Great Lent which immediately precedes Pascha (Easter). It is often read in the trapeza (refectory) in Orthodox monasteries, and in some places it is read in church as part of the Daily Office on Lenten weekdays, being prescribed in the Triodion.

An icon known by the same title, Ladder of Divine Ascent, depicts a ladder extending from earth to heaven. Several monks are depicted climbing a ladder; at the top is Jesus, prepared to receive them into Heaven. Also shown are angels helping the climbers, and demons attempting to drag down the climbers or shoot them with arrows, no matter how high up the ladder they may be. Most versions of the icon show at least one person falling. Often, in the lower right corner John Climacus himself is shown, gesturing towards the ladder, with rows of monks behind him.

Saint John's feast day is 30 March in both the East and West. The Eastern Orthodox Church and the Byzantine Catholic churches also commemorate him on the Fourth Sunday of Great Lent. Many churches are dedicated to him in Russia, including a church and belltower in the Moscow Kremlin. John Climacus was also known as "Scholasticus", but he is not to be confused with John Scholasticus, Patriarch of Constantinople.

Several translations into English have been made, including one by Holy Transfiguration Monastery (Boston, 1978). This volume contains the Life of St. John by Daniel, The Ladder of Divine Ascent, and To the Pastor, and provides footnotes explaining many of the concepts and terminology used from an Orthodox perspective, as well as a General Index.

== Gallery ==
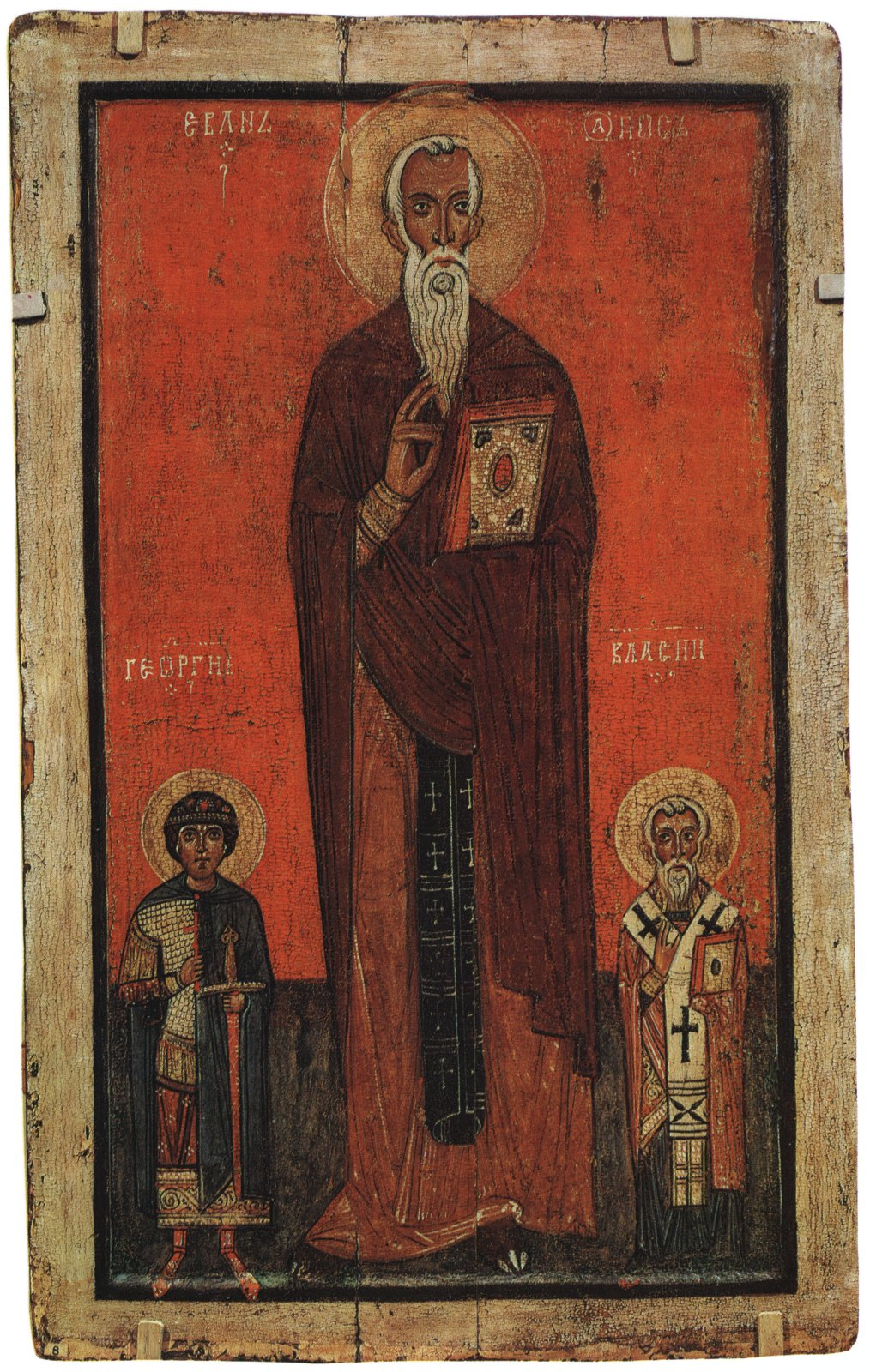
13th-century Russian icon of St. John Climacus; to either side are Saint George and Saint Blaise (Novgorod school)

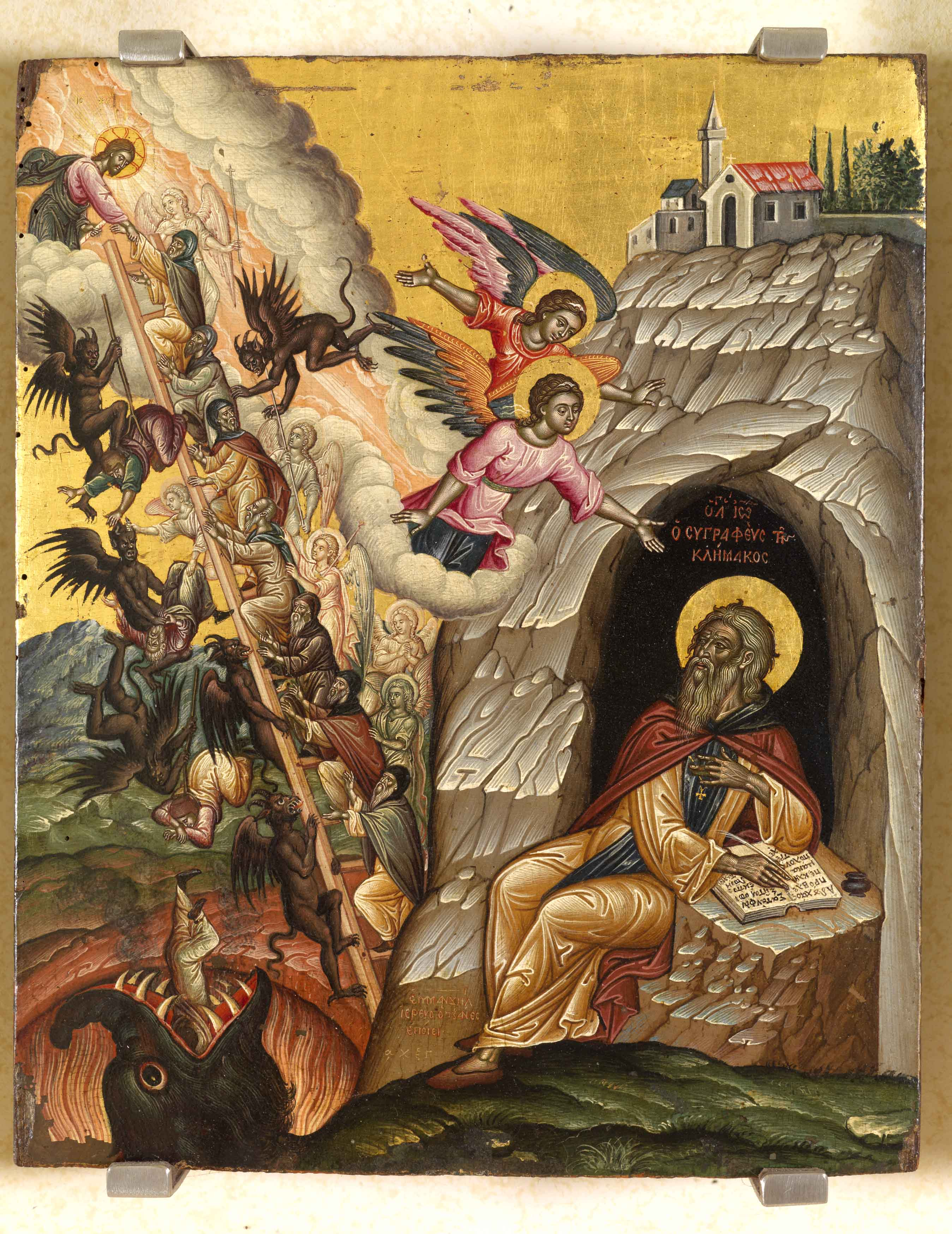
Ladder of Divine Ascent 1663 Emmanuel Tzanes

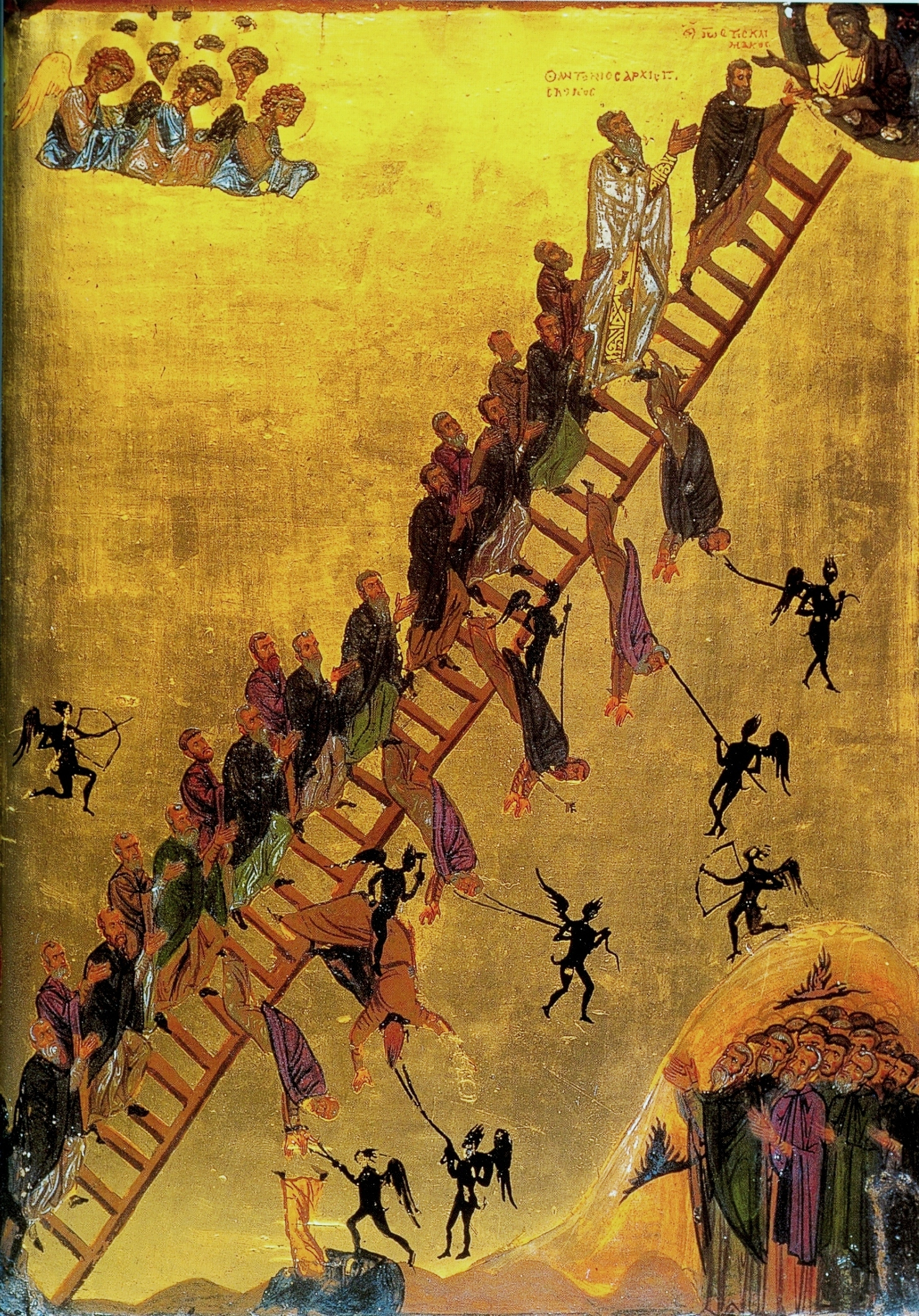
John Climacus is shown at the top of the Ladder of Divine Ascent icon, with other monks following him, 12th-century icon (Saint Catherine's Monastery, Mount Sinai, Egypt)

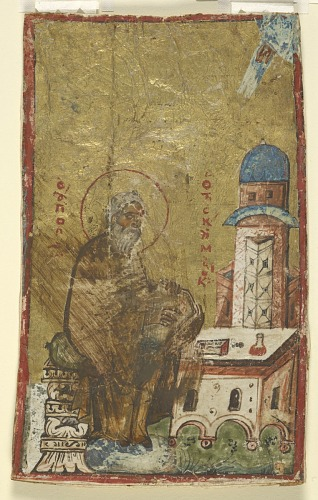
St. John of the Ladder (Climacus): illustration from a Klimax manuscript (early 12th century)

== See also ==
- Søren Kierkegaard, who published several works under the pseudonym "Johannes Climacus" and two under the pseudonym "Anti-Climacus"

== Sources ==
- Chryssavgis, John (2 March 2017). John Climacus: From the Egyptian Desert to the Sinaite Mountain. Routledge. ISBN 978-1-351-92521-1.
