= The Ladder of Divine Ascent =

Book by Johannes Climacus

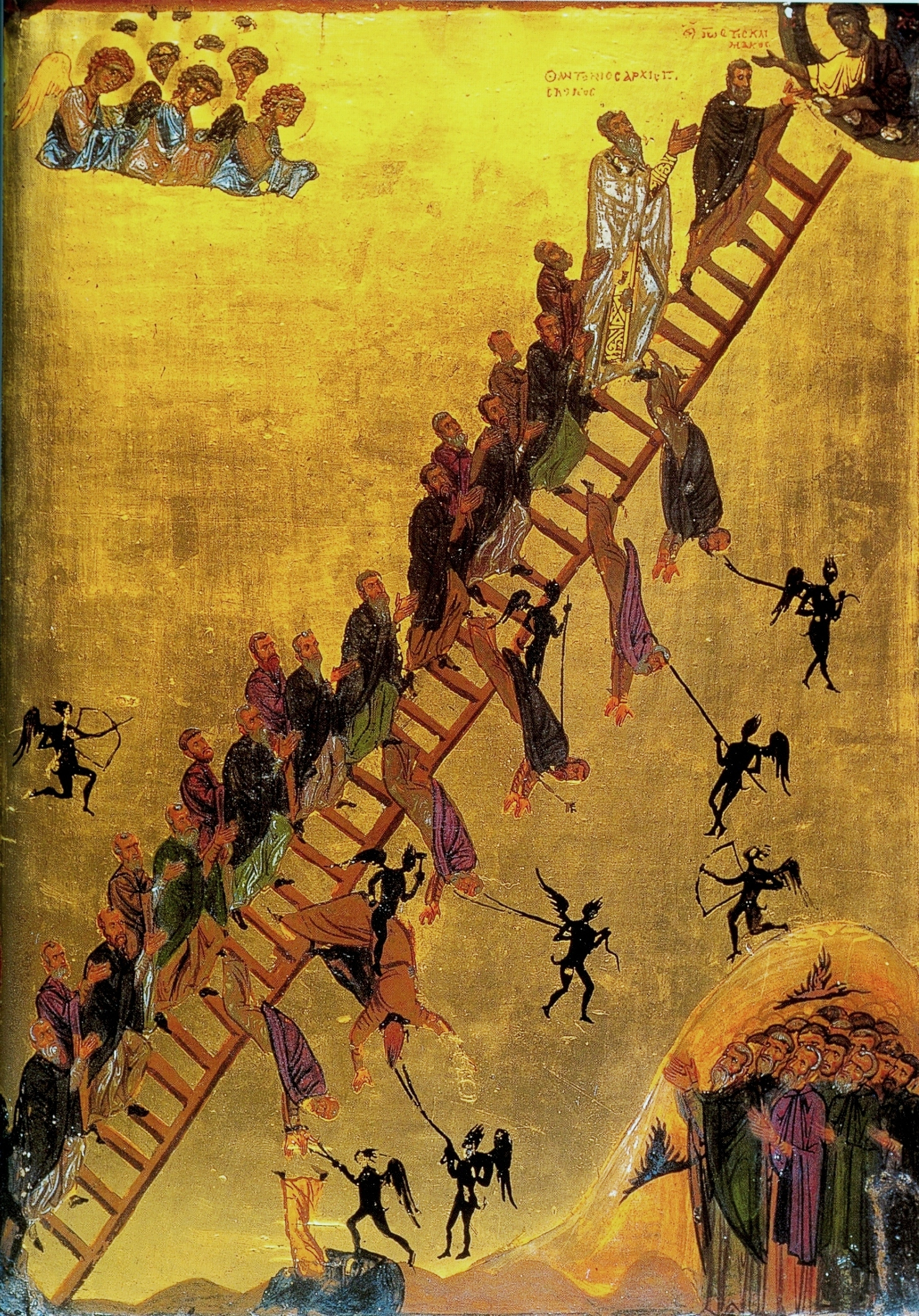
- The 12th-century Ladder of Divine Ascent icon (Saint Catherine's Monastery, Sinai Peninsula, Egypt) showing monks, led by John Climacus, ascending the ladder to Jesus, at the top right.
- Author: John Climacus
- Original title: Κλῖμαξ
- Language: Koine Greek
- Subject: Christian monasticism
- Published: c. 600 AD
- Publication place: Byzantine Empire

The Ladder of Divine Ascent or Ladder of Paradise (Κλῖμαξ [Klimax]; Scala or Climax Paradisi) is an important ascetical treatise for monasticism in Eastern Orthodoxy and Roman Catholicism, written by John Climacus in c. 600 AD at Saint Catherine's Monastery; it was requested by John, Abbot of the Raithu monastery.

The Scala, which obtained immense popularity and made its author famous in the Church, is addressed to anchorites and cenobites and treats of the means by which the highest degree of religious perfection may be attained. Divided into thirty parts, or "steps", in memory of the thirty years of the life of Christ—the "Divine Model" for the faithful Christian—it presents a picture of all the virtues, and contains a great many parables and historical touches, drawn principally from the monastic life and exhibiting the practical application of the precepts.

At the same time, as the work is mostly written in a concise, aphoristic form, and as the reasonings do not always seem clearly connected from one to the next, it is at times somewhat obscure. This explains its having been the subject of various commentaries, even in very early times. The most ancient of the manuscripts containing the Scala is found in the Bibliothèque Nationale in Paris and was probably brought from Florence by Catherine de' Medici. In some of these manuscripts, the work bears the title of "Spiritual Tables" (Plakes Pneumatikai in Greek).

== Steps or Rungs on the Ladder to Heaven ==
The Scala consists of 30 chapters, or "rungs",

- 1–4: Renunciation of the world and obedience to a spiritual father
  - 1. Περὶ ἀποταγῆς (On renunciation of the world, or asceticism)
  - 2. Περὶ ἀπροσπαθείας (On detachment)
  - 3. Περὶ ξενιτείας (On exile or pilgrimage; concerning dreams that beginners have)
  - 4. Περὶ ὑπακοῆς (On blessed and ever-memorable obedience (in addition to episodes involving many individuals))
- 5–7: Penitence and affliction (πένθος) as paths to true joy
  - 5. Περὶ μετανοίας (On painstaking and true repentance, which constitutes the life of the holy convicts, and about the Prison)
  - 6. Περὶ μνήμης θανάτου (On remembrance of death)
  - 7. Περὶ τοῦ χαροποιοῦ πένθους (On joy-making mourning)
- 8–17: Defeat of vices and acquisition of virtue
  - 8. Περἰ ἀοργησίας (On freedom from anger and on meekness)
  - 9. Περἰ μνησικακίας (On remembrance of wrongs)
  - 10. Περἰ καταλαλιᾶς (On slander or calumny)
  - 11. Περὶ πολυλογίας καἰ σιωπῆς (On talkativeness and silence)
  - 12. Περὶ ψεύδους (On lying)
  - 13. Περὶ ἀκηδίας (On despondency)
  - 14. Περὶ γαστριμαργίας (On that clamorous mistress, the stomach)
  - 15. Περὶ ἀγνείας (On incorruptible purity and chastity, to which the corruptible attain by toil and sweat)
  - 16. Περὶ φιλαργυρίας (On love of money, or avarice)
  - 17. Περὶ ἀκτημοσύνης (On non-possessiveness (that hastens one Heavenwards)
- 18–26: Avoidance of the traps of asceticism (laziness, pride, mental stagnation)
  - 18. Περὶ ἀναισθησίας (On insensibility, that is, deadening of the soul and the death of the mind before the death of the body)
  - 19. Περὶ ὕπνου καὶ προσευχῆς (On sleep, prayer, and psalmody with the brotherhood)
  - 20. Περὶ ἀγρυπνίας (On bodily vigil and how to use it to attain spiritual vigil, and how to practice it)
  - 21. Περὶ δειλίας (On unmanly and puerile cowardice)
  - 22. Περὶ κενοδοξίας (On the many forms of vainglory)
  - 23. Περὶ ὑπερηφανείας, Περὶ λογισμῶν βλασφημίας (On mad pride and (in the same Step) on unclean blasphemous thoughts; concerning unmentionable blasphemous thoughts)
  - 24. Περὶ πραότητος και ἁπλότητος (On meekness, simplicity, and guilelessness, which come not from nature but from conscious effort, and on guile)
  - 25. Περὶ ταπεινοφροσύνης (On the destroyer of the passions, most sublime humility, which is rooted in spiritual perception)
  - 26. Περὶ διακρίσεως (On discernment of thoughts, passions and virtues; on expert discernment; brief summary of all aforementioned)
- 27–29: Acquisition of hesychia, or peace of the soul, of prayer, and of apatheia (dispassion or equanimity with respect to afflictions or suffering)
  - 27. Περὶ ἡσυχίας (On holy stillness of body and soul; different aspects of stillness and how to distinguish them)
  - 28. Περὶ προσευχῆς (On holy and blessed prayer, the mother of virtues, and on the attitude of mind and body in prayer)
  - 29. Περὶ ἀπαθείας (Concerning Heaven on earth, or Godlike dispassion and perfection, and the resurrection of the soul before the general resurrection)
- 30. Περὶ ἀγάπης, ἐλπίδος και πίστεως (Concerning the linking together of the supreme trinity among the virtues; a brief exhortation summarizing all that has been said at length in this book)

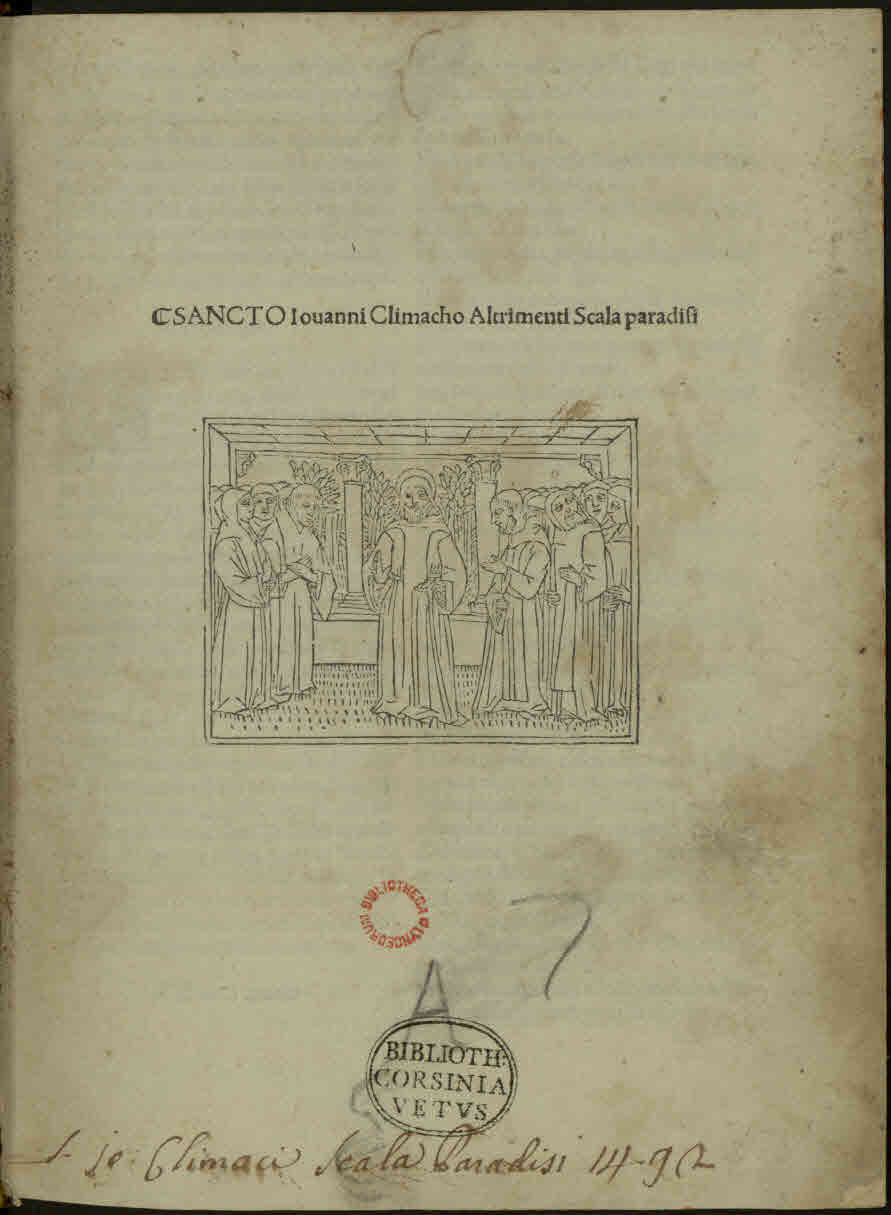
Scala paradisi, 1492 edition

== Iconography ==
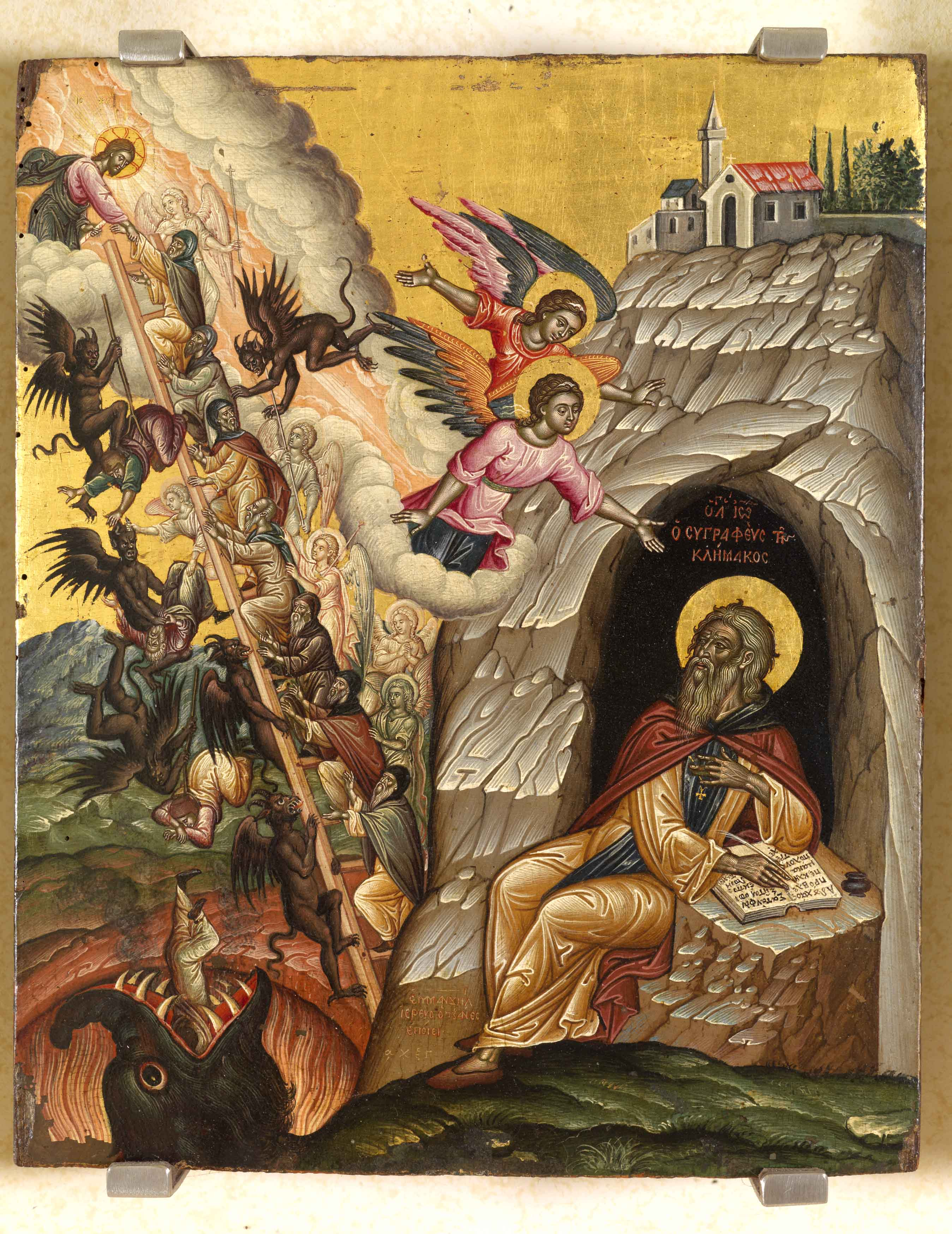
The Ladder of Divine Ascent featuring John Climacus, by Emmanuel Tzanes in 1663

The Ladder of Divine Ascent derived from manuscripts of the 11th and 12th century, pictorially bringing insight to heaven from a 30-rung ladder. The strategic placement of the ladder, which cuts the icon into two complementary triangles, represents heaven in the higher triangle and earth in the lower. The journey to the top of the ladder, where Jesus reaches down with open hands, is rife with obstacles of sin—represented by the demons with bows and arrows, ready to take the souls of those who lack perseverance. The act of climbing represents both physical pain as well as the struggle with internal sin; in this sense, the weight the monks feel is physical, mental, and spiritual. The icon shows several examples of monks that gave into the temptation of sin, as demons with dark chains hoist their victims off the ladder and into hell.

Climacus himself, however, reaches the top rung. His inspirational position close to Christ serves as a guide to those still struggling in their journey. A group of monastic brothers is gathered at the lower right, arms raised in prayer to the angels above in the upper left; this represents the thoughts and prayers that cut through the spiritual battlefield, giving support to those on the virtuous path to heaven: a life based on prayer and penance as the way to salvation. The angels represent the righteous climbing the ladder below in the same way that the holy brethren to the lower right mirror the angels above.

At the top of the ladder is Holy Archbishop Antonios, in a white robe with golden trim embracing the invitation to heaven with God. The white robe that Antonios wears is of silk with gold cuffs (epimanikia) and a sash (epitrachelion), which distinguishes him from the others on the ascent. The imperial status held by Archbishop Antonios implies a close relation to the icon itself—a symbol of his prominence within the religious community. His hands are lifted openly to mirror the grace Christ has given him; John Climacus, in front of the archbishop, is depicted performing the same gesture. Many inscriptions state that John Climacus has been "made one with God".

According to Hans Belting, it is not known if archbishop Antonios came from the capital of Sinai or was even an archbishop. Others, such as Doula Mouriki, hold that he was indeed an archbishop; this controversy over the imperial patronage of the icon remains today.

=== Arabic icon ===
The Heavenly Ladder was also adapted as an icon for the Arabic-speaking Christian community, likely at Saint Catherine's monastery on Mount Sinai. John Climacus leads his people through text on the left side of the page to show the Greek tradition, as contradistinct from the Arabic tradition, which would be read right-to-left instead; too, he does not sit on the floor as in the Muslim fashion, but rather at a desk. This is complemented with a smaller adaptation of the icon. The 17th-century Arabic reproduction shows Christ leading the pious to heaven from a ladder that cuts the icon from bottom right to upper left in ascending fashion—the opposite of the original icon from the late 12th century. Moses is depicted kneeling before the burning bush at the right. The Virgin Mary and Christ Child are illuminated inside the tear shaped flame. John Climacus is seen at the lower left with fellow monks at St. Catherine. At the base of the ladder a monk falling to hell maintains footing on the ladder as John Climacus assists by grabbing hold of the demon.

== Translations ==
=== Renaissance editions ===
The Ladder was translated into Latin by Ambrogio the Camaldolese, then writing as Ambrosius Camaldulensis (Venice, 1531 and 1569; Cologne, 1583, 1593—with a commentary by Denis the Carthusian—and 1601). The Greek of the Scala, with the scholia of Elias, Archbishop of Crete, and also the text of the Liber ad Pastorem, were published by Matthæus Raderus with a Latin translation (Paris, 1633). The whole is reproduced in Patrologia Graeca, vol. 88 (Paris, 1860).

Translations of the Scala have been published in Spanish by Louis of Granada (Salamanca, 1551), in Italian (Venice, 1585), in modern Greek by Maximus Margunius, Bishop of Cerigo (Venice, 1590), and in French by Arnauld d'Andilly (Paris, 1688). The last-named of these translations is preceded by a life of the saint by Le Maistre de Sacy.

One translation of the Scala, La Escala Espiritual de San Juan Clímaco, became the first book printed in the Americas, in 1532.

=== Modern English editions ===
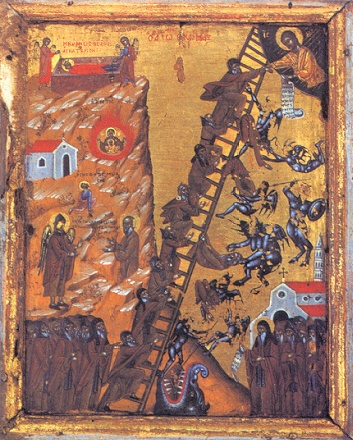
The Ladder of Paradise icon (Saint Catherine's Monastery, Sinai Peninsula, Egypt) showing monks ascending (and falling from) the ladder to Jesus

- Archimandrite Lazarus Moore. The Ladder of Divine Ascent. First published 1959, Holy Transfiguration Monastery / Harper & Brothers; revised edition published 2008, HTM. ISBN 0943405033. This edition is generally preferred over the Paulist Press edition of the Ladder due to the provided verse numberings, which are the standard way of referencing the work.
- Luibheid, Colm; Russell, Norman. John Climacus: The Ladder of Divine Ascent. Paulist Press, 1982. ISBN 0809123304. This edition contains an extensive introduction by Bishop Kallistos.
- Mack, John. Ascending the Heights: A Layman's Guide to the Ladder of Divine Ascent. Conciliar Press, 2000. ISBN 1888212179.

== See also ==
- Anchorite
- Cenobite
- Orthodox Monastic Orders
- Great chain of being, or the scala natura (ladder of nature)
- Hesychasm
- Jacob's Ladder
- Matarta in Mandaeism
- Philokalia
- Stoic passions
- Codex Climaci Rescriptus
