= Amadeus IX of Savoy =

Duke of Savoy from 1465 to 1472

Amadeus IX
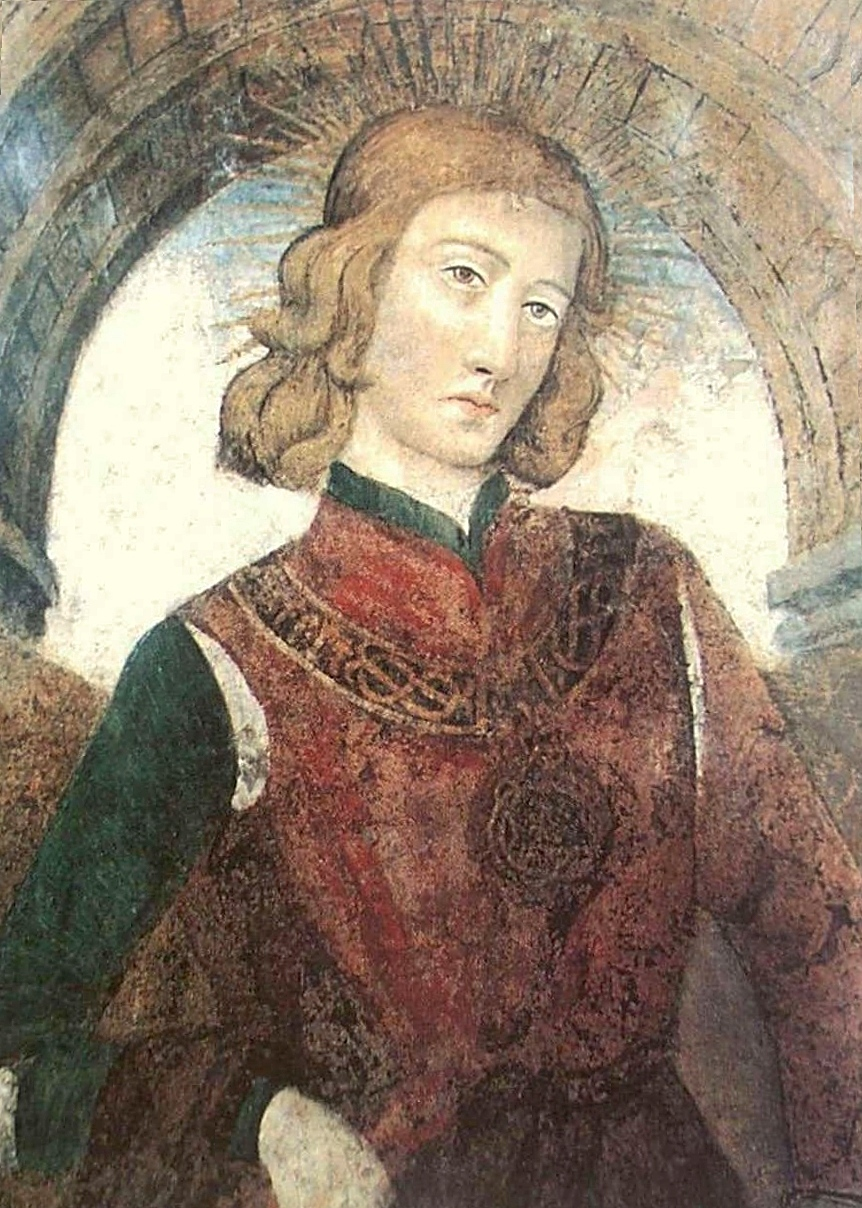
- Portrait by Antoine de Lonhy in the Church and Convent of Saint Dominic in Turin, c. 1474

Duke of Savoy
- Reign: 29 January 1465 – 30 March 1472
- Predecessor: Louis
- Successor: Philibert I
- Born: 1 February 1435; Thonon-les-Bains
- Died: 30 March 1472 (aged 37)
- Spouse: Yolande of Valois
- Issue: Anne; Maria; Louise; Filiberto; Carlo
- House: Savoy
- Father: Louis, Duke of Savoy
- Mother: Anne de Lusignan
- Religion: Roman Catholic

Amadeus IX (1 February 1435 – 30 March 1472), nicknamed the Happy, was the Duke of Savoy from 1465 to 1472. Known for his piety, charity, and gentle nature, he is venerated by the Catholic Church with a liturgical feast on 30 March. He was beatified by Pope Innocent XI in 1677.

== Life ==
Amadeus was born in Thonon-les-Bains, the son of Louis, Duke of Savoy, and Anne de Lusignan, daughter of Janus of Cyprus, King of Cyprus. In 1452, his mother arranged a political marriage to Yolande of Valois (1434–1478), sister of Louis XI of France and daughter of Charles VII of France. Because of his epilepsy and retirement, she was left in control of the state.

France and the Holy Roman Empire competed to gain control of Savoy's strategically important Alpine mountain passes and trade routes. His sister, Charlotte of Savoy, became the second wife of Louis XI. French influence increased in Savoy and involved the country in the wars between France and the emperors. The Castle of Moncalleri in Piedmont, Italy had been built around 1100 as a hill fortress, to command the main southern access from Turin. In the mid-15th century, Yolande turned it into a Renaissance Royal Palace.

Amadeus was a particular protector of Franciscan friars. He also endowed other religious houses as well as homes for the care of the poor and suffering. He made a pilgrimage to Saint-Claude in 1471. He died the following year.

Amadeus was an avid collector of manuscripts, adding over sixty items to the ducal library started by his great-grandfather Amadeus VII, Count of Savoy.

== Family ==
Coat of Arms of the Dukes of Savoy

Amadeus IX had ten children with Yolande of Valois:

1. Louis (1453)
2. Anne (1455–1480), married Frederick IV of Naples (1452–1504), prince of Altamura
3. Charles (1456–1471), Prince of Piedmont
4. Maria (1460–1511) married Philip of Hachberg-Sausenberg (1454–1503)
5. Louise (1461–1503), married Hugh, Prince of Chalon and, later, became a Poor Clare nun
6. Philibert (1465–1482)
7. Bernard (1467)
8. Charles (1468–1490)
9. James Louis (1470–1485), Count of Genevois, France
10. Gian Claudio Galeazzo (1472)

His daughter Louise became a nun of the Franciscan Second Order after being widowed at a young age. She was also beatified.

== Beatification ==
A reputation for miracles began to grow around a 1474 painting of Amadeus, which was housed in the Dominican church in Turin.

Michel Merle suggests that the cult of Amadeus was part of a decades-long effort on the part of the House of Savoy to enhance its political status. 1612 saw the publication in Turin of a brief text extolling Amadeus, by Girolamo Cordieri, canon of the cathedral chapter of Mondovi. Cordieri was later to be appointed theologian to Charles Emmanuel I, Duke of Savoy. Also in 1612, a canon from Vercelli published a compendium of miracles attributed to Amadeus' intercession.

In 1613, a Historia del Beato Amedeo terzo duca di Savoia was composed by Fr. Pietro-Francisco Malletta. Six years later, the Duke of Savoy issued nine-florin coins depicting Amadeus IX on one side. These appear to have been used as religious medals, particularly in the Chablais, where they were distributed by Francis de Sales.

Presented as a holy prince known for his charity and concern for the poor, Amadeus IX was beatified on 3 March 1677 by Pope Innocent XI.

== Ancestry ==
Ancestors of Amadeus IX of Savoy

8. Amadeus VII, Count of Savoy
4. Amadeus VIII, Duke of Savoy
9. Bonne of Berry
2. Louis, Duke of Savoy
10. Philip II, Duke of Burgundy
5. Mary of Burgundy
11. Margaret III, Countess of Flanders
1. Amadeus IX, Duke of Savoy
12. James I of Cyprus
6. Janus of Cyprus
13. Helvis of Brunswick
3. Anne of Cyprus
14. John I, Count of La Marche
7. Charlotte of Bourbon
15. Catherine of Vendôme

== Sources ==
- Hand, Joni M. (2013). Women, Manuscripts and Identity in Northern Europe, 1350-1550. Routledge.220

Amadeus IX of Savoy House of Savoy Born: 1 February 1435 Died: 30 March 1472
Regnal titles
Preceded by Louis	Duke of Savoy; 1465–1472	Succeeded by Philibert I
