= Prayer book =

Book containing prayers and devotional readings

A prayer book is a book containing prayers and perhaps devotional readings, for private or communal use, or in some cases, outlining the liturgy of religious services. Books containing mainly orders of religious services, or readings for them are termed "service books" or "liturgical books", and are thus not prayer-books in the strictest sense, but the term is often used very loosely. A religion's scriptures might also be considered prayer books as well.

== Judaism ==
In Judaism, the Siddur is a prayer book "containing the three daily prayers; also the prayers for Shabbat, Rosh-Chodesh and the festivals."

== Christianity ==
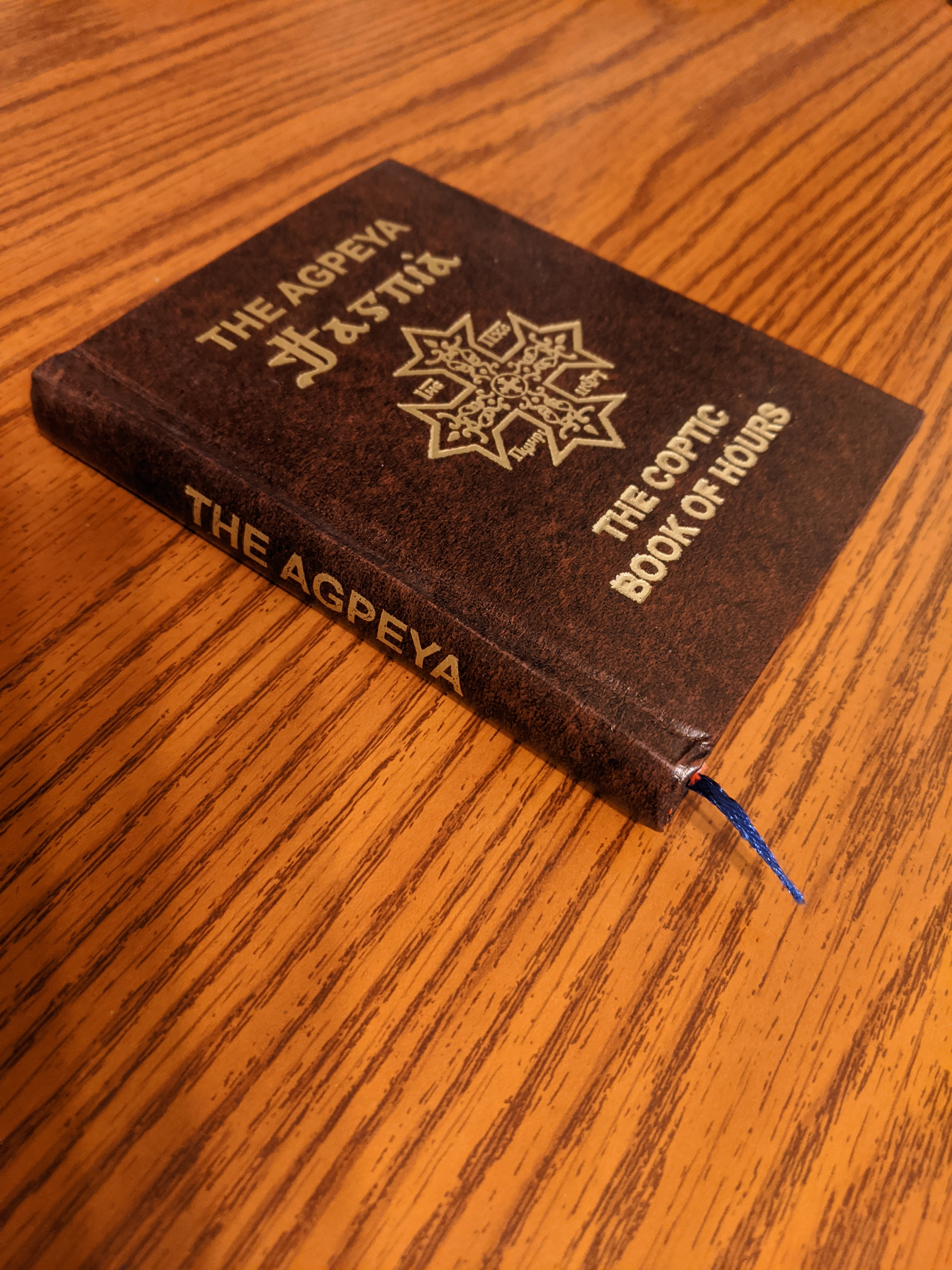
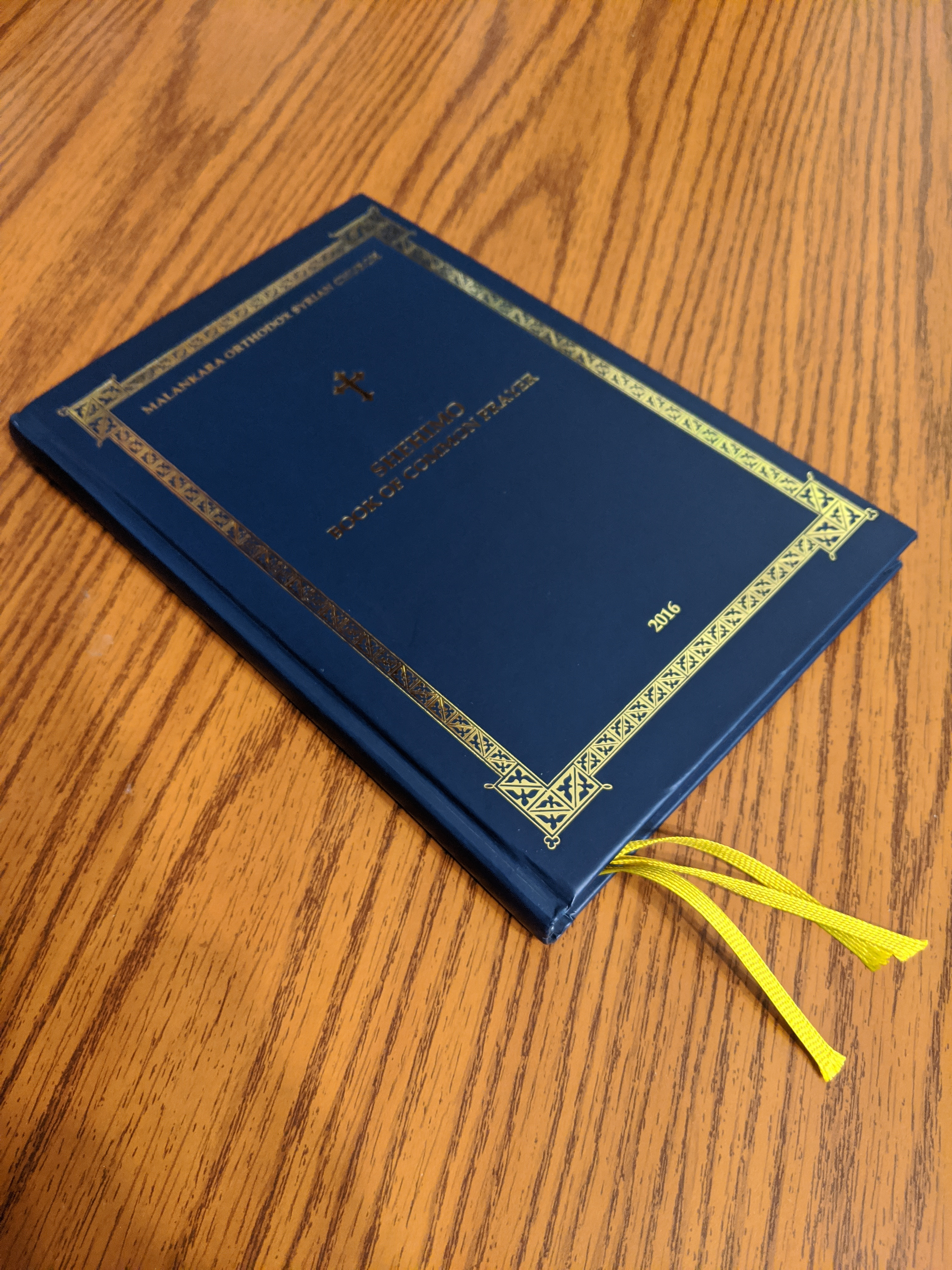
The Agpeya and Shehimo are breviaries used in Oriental Orthodox Christianity to pray the canonical hours at seven fixed prayer times of the day in the eastward direction.

=== Breviaries ===
Breviaries are prayer books used in many Christian denominations by believers to pray at fixed prayer times the canonical hours seven times a day, a practice that has its roots in Psalm 119:164.

=== Daily devotional ===
Throughout the year, and especially during certain seasons of the Christian liturgical kalendar such as Advent and Lent, many Christians pray a daily devotional, which contains a prayer for each day along with a reflection on a passage from the Christian Bible.

=== Use in Christian pilgrimages ===
As a popular place of Evangelical-Lutheran pilgrimage, Christians reach Vadstena Abbey Church through the Saint Birgitta Ways, using The Pilgrim's Prayer Book (Pilgrimens tidegärd) throughout the day; the first of the three prayers in The Pilgrim's Prayer Book are the same prayers said daily at 8 am, 12 pm and 4 pm at Vadstena Abbey Church. During their journey to Vadstena Abbey Evangelical-Lutheran Church, Christian pilgrims pause along the Saint Birgitta Ways trails to pray from this prayer book (which functions as a small breviary to pray the canonical hours). Upon arrival to Vadstena Abbey Church, Evangelical-Lutheran pilgrims attend the celebration of Mass and receive the Eucharist there.

=== Notable prayer books ===
The following are among the many books to which the term may loosely refer in various churches, although in strict usage a prayer book is likely to mean a miscellaneous book of prayers as opposed to the standard service books as listed in the last group below:

General

- Daily Watchwords (Moravian Christian)
- A Devoted Christian's Prayer Book [Die Ernsthafte Christenpflicht] (Anabaptist Christian)
- Raccolta (Catholic Christian)
- Saint Augustine's Prayer Book (Anglican Christian)
- Vatican Croatian Prayer Book (Catholic Christian)

Breviaries

- Agpeya (Coptic Orthodox Christianity)
- Anglican Breviary (Anglican Christianity)
- For All the Saints (Lutheran Christianity)
- Roman Breviary (Roman Catholic Christianity)
- Shehimo (Indian Orthodox Christianity)
- Take Our Moments and Our Days: An Anabaptist Prayer Book (Mennonite Christianity)
- The Brotherhood Prayer Book (Lutheran Christianity)
- Book of Hours, a prayer book that contains the canonical hours in various branches of Christianity
- Common Worship: Daily Prayer The first prayer book published since the Reformation by the Church of England containing the complete round of services of the Word for every day of the year: Morning Prayer, Prayer During the Day, Evening Prayer and Night Prayer, also called Compline.

Officially prescribed liturgical books:

- Roman Missal in Roman Catholicism
- Lutheran Service Book or Evangelical Lutheran Worship, in Lutheranism
- Agenda (liturgy), in Lutheranism
- Officially prescribed prayer books of the Anglican Communion – notable examples:
  - Book of Common Prayer 1662: till today still the normative liturgy of the Church of England and several other Churches of the Communion, though most churches rarely or never use it for services nowadays. It and earlier versions of it (notably 1549 and 1552), have had considerable literary influence on the English language.
  - Common Worship: Current official liturgical books of the Church of England, adopted 2000, as alternatives to the BCP, and now most widely used in regular church worship.
  - Alternative Service Book (adopted in 1980), in the Church of England until supplanted by Common Worship.
  - Book of Common Prayer (1979), primary liturgical book of the U.S. Episcopal Church
- Directory of Public Worship, adopted to a limited extent in certain areas of the Church of England in the 17th century as a more strictly protestant rejection of the BCP; the initial basis for Church of Scotland worship and important in the early development of the Scottish Reformation.

== Mandaeism ==
The canonical prayer book in Mandaeism is the Qulasta.

== See also ==
- Libelli precum
- Missal
