= Anne of Savoy =

Savoy royal (1455–1480)

- Princess of Squillace, Altamura, and Taranto
- Born: 1 June 1455
- Died: February 1480 (aged 24)
- Buried: Chambéry
- Noble family: Savoy
- Spouse: King Frederick IV of Naples
- Issue: Charlotte of Naples, Princess of Taranto
- Father: Amadeus IX of Savoy
- Mother: Yolande of France

Anne of Savoy, Princess of Squillace, Altamura, and Taranto (1 June 1455 – February 1480) was the first wife of King Frederick IV. She died 16 years before he succeeded to the Neapolitan throne, so she was never queen consort. Anne was a member of the House of Savoy, and through her mother Yolande of France, she was a granddaughter of King Charles VII of France.

== Family and marriage ==
Anne was born on 1 June 1455, the eldest daughter and one of the 10 children of Amadeus IX of Savoy and Yolande of France, daughter of King Charles VII of France and Marie of Anjou. She had seven brothers, including Philibert and Charles; and two younger sisters. Due to her father's epilepsy, her mother ruled Savoy.

In the summer of 1479 in Milan, Anne married Frederick of Aragon, Prince of Squillace, Altamura and Tarento (1452–1504), the future King Frederick IV of Naples. Together they had:

- Charlotte of Naples, Princess of Taranto (February 1480 – 16 October 1506), married in 1500 Guy XV de Laval, Count of Laval, by whom she had issue.

== Death and legacy ==
Anne died in March 1480, probably in childbirth or shortly afterwards. She was buried in Chambéry. Her husband married as his second wife, Isabella del Balzo, by whom he had five more children. In 1496, 16 years after Anne's death, he ascended the throne as the last King of Naples of the House of Trastamara.

Her daughter, Charlotte was brought up at the French court. In 1496, she succeeded to the suo jure title of Princess of Taranto.

== Ancestors ==
Ancestors of Anne of Savoy

8. Amadeus VIII, Duke of Savoy
4. Louis, Duke of Savoy
9. Mary of Burgundy, Duchess of Savoy
2. Amadeus IX, Duke of Savoy
10. Janus of Cyprus
5. Anne of Cyprus
11. Charlotte of Bourbon, Queen of Cyprus
1. Anne of Savoy
12. Charles VI of France
6. Charles VII of France
13. Isabeau of Bavaria
3. Yolande of Valois
14. Louis II of Naples
7. Marie of Anjou
15. Yolande of Aragon

== Sources ==
- Walsh, Richard J. (2005). Charles the Bold and Italy (1467-1477): Politics and Personnel. Liverpool University Press.
