= Visconti Castle (Vercelli) =

Castle in northern Italy

- Castello Visconteo di Vercelli
- Vercelli, Piedmont, Northern Italy
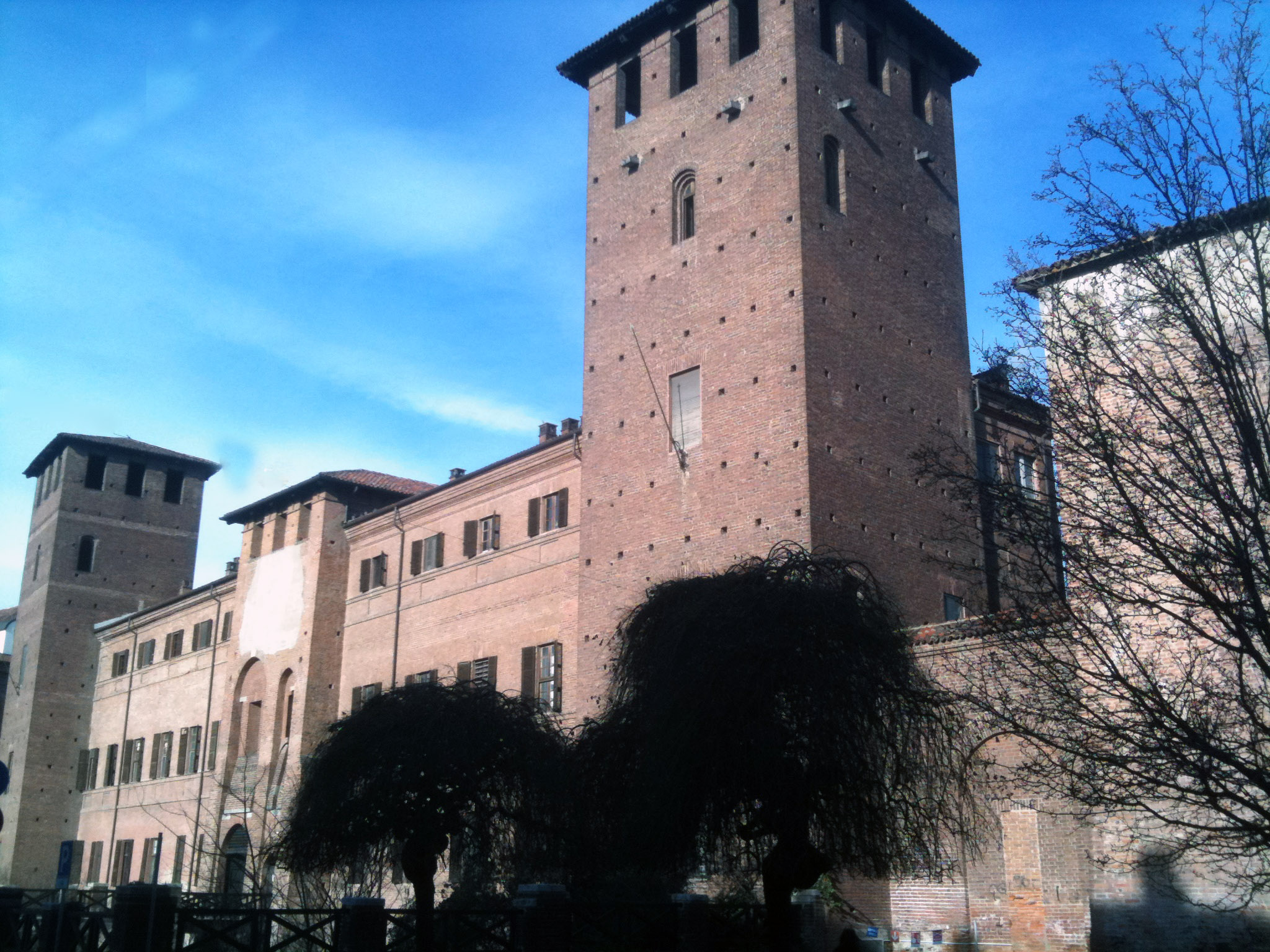
- Front of the castle

Site information
- Type: Medieval castle
- Owner: Italian State
- Open to the public: Only for its public office functions
- Condition: Good

Location
- Coordinates: 45°19′40.66″N 8°25′33.35″E

Site history
- Built: around 1290
- Built by: Matteo Visconti
- Materials: Bricks

The Visconti Castle of Vercelli is a medieval castle in Vercelli, Piedmont, Northern Italy. Erected at the end of the 13th century, it underwent subsequent transformation to be changed in its use. Today it is the seat of the Tribunal of Vercelli.

== History ==
The Visconti of Milan took control of Vercelli at the end of the 13th century, during their initial expansion outside Milan. Around 1290, Matteo Visconti ordered the construction of the castle, probably on a previous building's ruins.

It had the classic layout of the Visconti castles of the Lombardy plains: quadrangular, with square towers at each corner, two entrances on opposite sides, and an internal courtyard. Another small door ("pusterla") was in the south-eastern corner. An inner wing ("rocchetta") leaned on the southern side. The castle's primary purpose was to show a sign of the Visconti's power over Vercelli. Being along the city's wall, it also reinforced its defense to the south.

In 1427 the Visconti handed over Vercelli to Amadeus VIII, Duke of Savoy. The castle became a seat of the House of Savoy and came to be known as Savoy Castle. The blessed Amadeus IX, Duke of Savoy died there in 1472. Yolande of Valois, her widow, had it restored and enlarged.

In the following centuries, the castle declined. As a military building, it was no longer useful, and, as civil work, it became unsuitable compared to other residences of the Savoy house. At the time of the Franco-Spanish War (1635–1659), it was damaged during the Spanish siege in 1638. The people of Vercelli had the castle repaired to the best of their ability. Vercelli's governors continued to live there during the Napoleonic age. In 1832, the Vercelli prison moved there.

In the 20th century, further adaptations and reparations transformed the building into the Vercelli Tribunal seat. The restorations ended in 1931. They consisted of the reconstruction of the collapsed towers, the erection of a new one on the right side of the facade, the addition of internal bodies, and the reopening of the seventeenth-century arcades on the ground floor and first floor. The works rebuilt the original southern gate, with a wooden bridge over the moat, and the pusterla in the south-eastern corner.

== Today ==
The castle is open only from the outside. Being used as Tribunal, it is accessible internally only for its state functions.

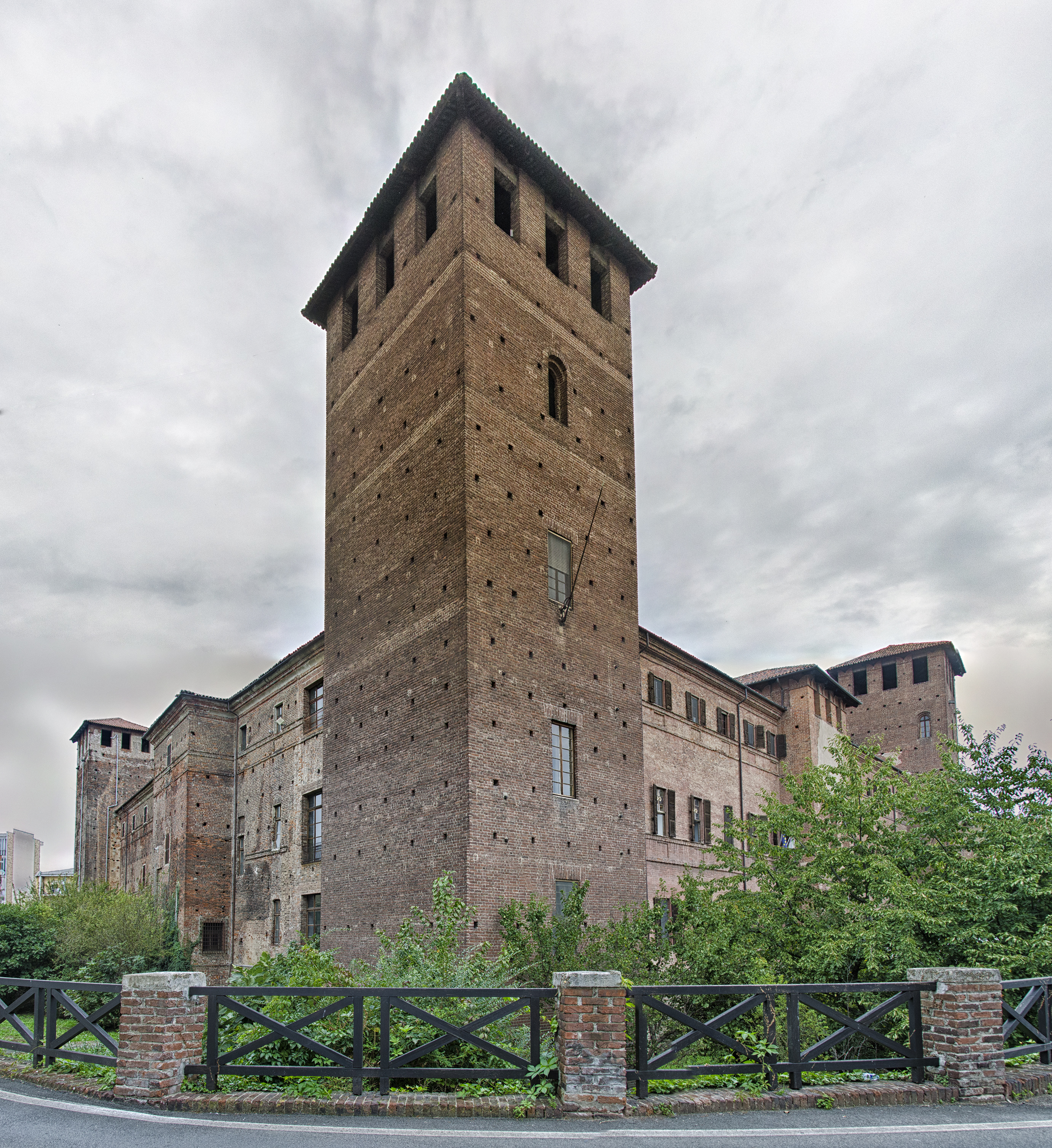
The castle seen from the south-west corner

== Sources ==
- Conti, Flavio (1975). I castelli del Piemonte. Tomo I (in Italian). Milano: Görlich Editore.
- Black, Jane (2009). Absolutism in Renaissance Milan. Plenitude of power under the Visconti and the Sforza 1329–1535. Oxford: Oxford University Press. ISBN 9780199565290.
