= Marie of Savoy, Duchess of Milan =

Italian noble (1411–1469)

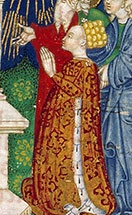
Portrait of Marie de Savoy in the Breviary of Marie of Savoy

Marie of Savoy (1411–1469) was a Duchess of Milan by marriage to Filippo Maria Visconti.

== Biography ==
Marie was a daughter of Amadeus VIII, Duke of Savoy (later the Antipope Felix V) and Mary of Burgundy. Her maternal grandparents were Philip the Bold and Margaret of Flanders.

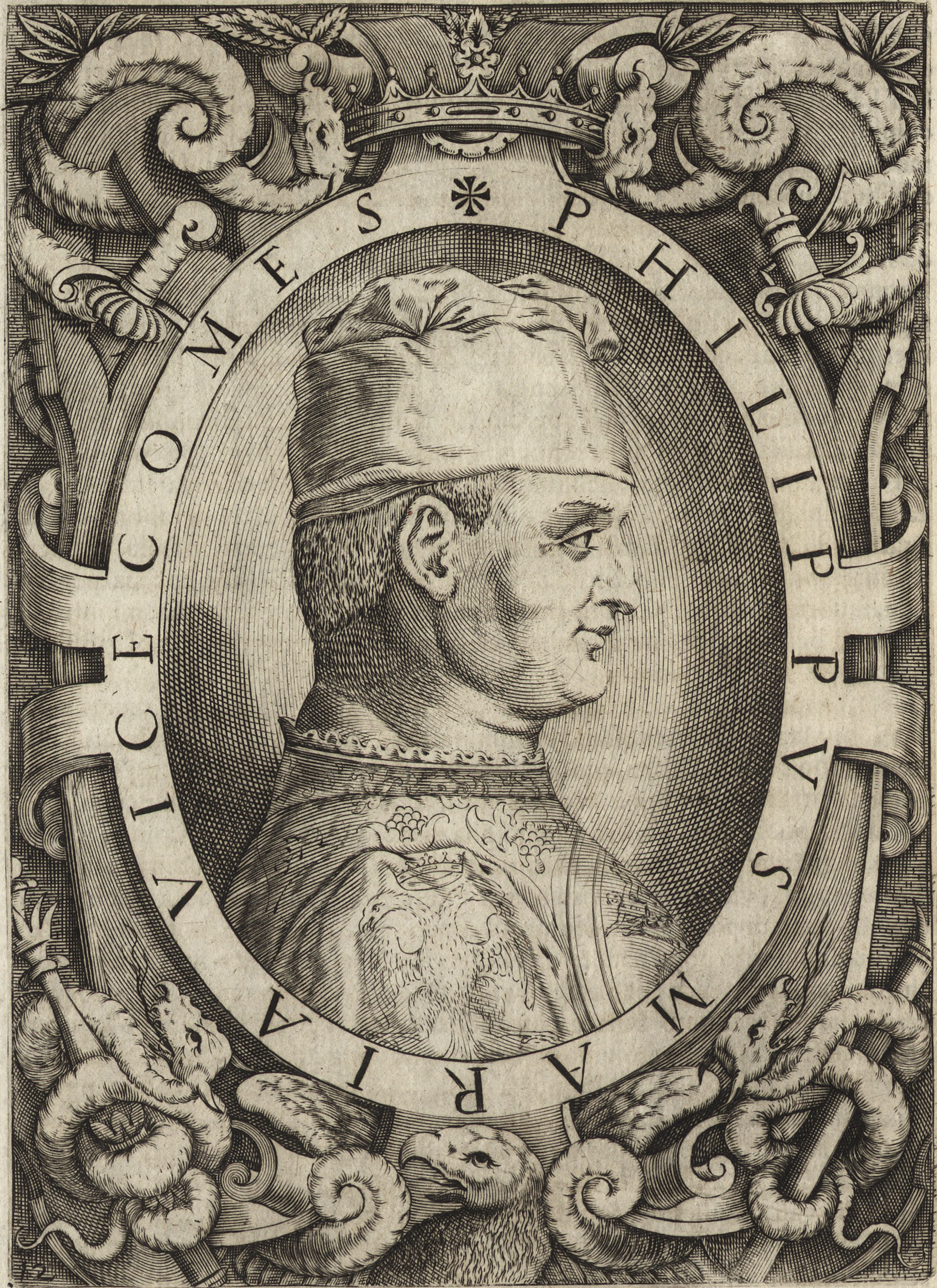
Filippo Maria Visconti

In July 1425, Marie's father the Duke of Savoy was persuaded to join the Venetian republic in the what would be called the Wars in Lombardy between the Venetians against the Duchy of Milan and to hinder his conquest of neighbouring territories. Later that year the Milanese army at Maclodio (4 October 1427), were defeated by the Venetians.

While a victory, several circumstances prevented it from being a complete one. Filippo Maria, Duke of Milan then negotiated an agreement wherein he would make peace with Amadeus VIII by Filippo Maria marrying Amadeus daughter, Marie and as part of the marriage agreement she would be given Vercelli as her dower lands.

Only a few months later on 2 December 1427 Marie and Filippo Maria were married by proxy at Turin. The marriage was celebrated in a lavish feast at Château du Bourget-du-lac held by the brides father. The Breviary of Marie of Savoy was made for Marie on occasion of her wedding.

Marie's grand-aunt Bianca of Savoy had been married to Filippo Marias great-grandfather Galeazzo II, which made Marie and Filippo Maria second cousins.

In 1428, her mother Mary of Burgundy passed away. This could explain why Marie's departure from Savoy for Milan was delayed. Marie was accompanied to Milan by her brother and an entourage that consisted of several ladies in waiting such as Guigonne de Luyrieux, a kinswoman of Marie and granddaughter of Humbert of Savoy.

=== Marriage ===
On 6 September 1428, she left Thonon and arrived at Verceille, where the seventeen-year-old Marie was married to the thirty-six-year old Filippo Maria on 29 September Marie's dowry was set at one hundred thousand gold florins. Marie and her new husband entered Milan on 8 October.

Marie's husband was a capable ruler, but he had a suspicious and paranoid nature after his older brother was assassinated by his close attendants.

Filippo Marie was already in a devoted and long-term relationship with his mistress, Agnese del Maino. who had given birth to his daughter Bianca Maria in 1425. She was, however, not of high enough rank to become duchess of Milan, so Filippo Maria was pressured by his advisers to make a more suitable marriage and conceive an heir. After the marriage Filippo Maria left his new wife mostly alone; but at same time he was so fearful of his young wife being unfaithful that he had her isolated and attended only by women. Deeply superstitious, he paid huge sums to astrologers and magicians to find a way for him to have a son and heir. But they had no children.

Marie, on the other hand, was said to have so much affection for her husband, that a Milanese historian remarked that on the day her husband had touched her hands, she did not want to wash them. Marie was very virtuous, and because of this she was venerated in Milan. She also expressed her piety through commissioning a breviary, the Bréviaire de Marie de Savoie (ca. 1430).

=== Widowhood ===
After the death of Filippo Maria in 1447 Marie tried to advocate for her brother Louis of Savoy to become the next duke of Milan. This was based on a proposal that Louis had made in 1434 that should either of them die without an heir then the other should inherit the others lands. Louis had been married to Anne of Cyprus since 1432 but their first child was not born until (1435).

Marie however found herself outmaneuvered by her stepdaughters husband Francesco Sforza who succeeded her husband as the new ruler. Marie then retired to Visconti Castle at Vercelli to live a religious life.

=== Death ===
Marie died in 1458 while a nun at a Saint Clare.

In her will she bequeathed her wealth to her brother Louis. but when he died before her, she instead left it to Louis of Achaea, the step-son of her paternal aunt Bonne of Savoy, and to a niece.

Marie requested that she be buried in the church of Santa Maria di Billiemme in Vercelli.

== Ancestry ==
Ancestors of Marie of Savoy, Duchess of Milan

4. Amadeus VII, Count of Savoy
2. Amadeus VIII of Savoy
10. John, Duke of Berry
5. Bonne of Berry
11. Joanna of Armagnac
1. Marie of Savoy, Duchess of Milan
3. Mary of Burgundy

== Sources ==
- Bartlett, Kenneth R. (2013). A Short History of the Italian Renaissance. North York, Ontario: University of Toronto Press. p. 181. ISBN 978-1-4426-8584-0. OCLC 870652622.
- Hand, Joni M. (2017). Women, Manuscripts and Identity in Northern Europe, 1350-1550. Routledge. ISBN 978-1-351-53652-3. OCLC 1003859888.
- Thevet, André (2010). Schlesinger, Roger (ed.). Portraits from the French Renaissance and the Wars of Religion. Translated by Benson, Edward. Kirksville, MO: Truman State University Press. doi:10.1515/9780271090719. ISBN 978-1-935503-60-6. OCLC 794412688.
- Wilkins, David G.; Wilkins, Rebecca L. (1996). The Search for a Patron in the Middle Ages and the Renaissance. Lewiston: E. Mellen Press. ISBN 978-0-7734-8867-0. OCLC 33440947.

Preceded by Beatrice Lascaris di Tenda	Duchess of Milan; 1428–1447	Succeeded by Bianca Maria Visconti
