= Louise of Savoy (nun) =

French nun

Blessed Louise of Savoy, O.S.C.
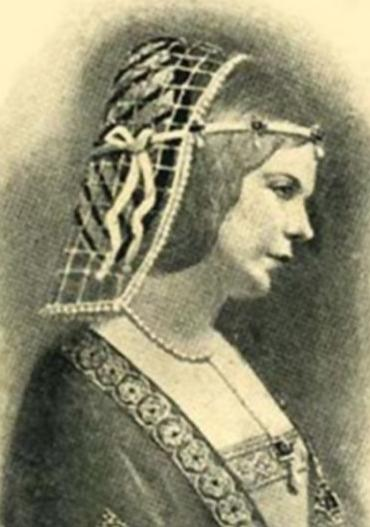

Princess, widow and nun
- Born: 28 December 1461; Duchy of Savoy
- Died: 24 July 1503; Orbe, Old Swiss Confederacy
- Venerated in: Roman Catholic Church
- Beatified: 1839 by Pope Gregory XVI
- Feast: 24 July

Louise of Savoy (28 December 1461 – 24 July 1503) was a member of the French royal family, who gave up a life of privilege and comfort to become a Poor Clare nun. She was beatified by the Roman Catholic Church in 1839.

== Life ==
Louise was born on 28 December 1461, the Feast of the Holy Innocents, to the Amadeus IX, Duke of Savoy, and his wife, Yolande of Valois, the sister of King Louis XI of France. Through her mother, Louise was a collateral descendant of the Franciscan saint Elizabeth of Hungary. She was born the fifth of their ten children. Her father was a very pious ruler who gave much attention to works of charity in his duchy. He suffered from epilepsy, which, added to his retiring nature, led him to leave the mechanisms of government in the hands of his wife. He himself was beatified in 1677.

Louise showed an inclination to spiritual life at a very young age. While still a child, she was found to be fasting on only bread and water on the Vigil of any major feast day of the Blessed Virgin Mary. Despite the active court life around her, she was drawn to prayer and solitude. Yet she was marked by a spirit of obedience, and when her mother insisted that she dress well in keeping with her station, she would obey. She would wear a hairshirt under her lovely garments, though.

When she was older, Louise naturally was drawn to enter a monastery. Her uncle, the King, however, arranged that she marry on 24 August 1479 to Hugues de Chalon, (d.3 Jul 1490) of the House of Chalon-Arlay, to which she was agreeable. In her typical attitude of obedience, she saw the hand of God in this arrangement. The Prince proved to be a pious young man who supported his wife's efforts at living a life of faith and self-denial in the midst of their luxuries. Louise set a high tone of morality for her court, starting with her attendants. She would demand that any man found to be using foul language be required to make a donation to the poor as a penance. They held the usual court events, such as dances, but did not participate in the revels.

This life of happiness soon ended, though, as her husband, the Prince, died when she was 27 years of age. As she had no children, the young widow then determined to follow her calling as a nun, refusing many offers of marriage. She used her vast wealth to meet many needs of the poor and entered the monastery of the Poor Clare nuns in Orbe, now part of modern Switzerland.

In the cloister, she showed herself to be a model of humility and obedience, preserving nothing of her royal origins. Louise died at the age of forty-two. She was beatified by Pope Gregory XVI in 1839. Her feast is observed by the Poor Clares on the date of her death.

== Ancestry ==
Ancestors of Louise of Savoy (nun)

8. Amadeus VIII, Duke of Savoy
4. Louis, Duke of Savoy
9. Mary of Burgundy
2. Amadeus IX, Duke of Savoy
10. Janus of Cyprus
5. Anne of Cyprus
11. Charlotte of Bourbon
1. Louise of Savoy
12. Charles VI of France
6. Charles VII of France
13. Isabeau of Bavaria
3. Yolande of Valois
14. Louis II of Naples
7. Marie of Anjou
15. Yolande of Aragon

== See also ==
- Amadeus IX, Duke of Savoy

== External sources ==
- Franciscan Saints Calendar
