= Moncrivello Castle =

Castle in Piedmont, Italy

- Castello di Moncrivello
- Moncrivello, Piedmont, Italy
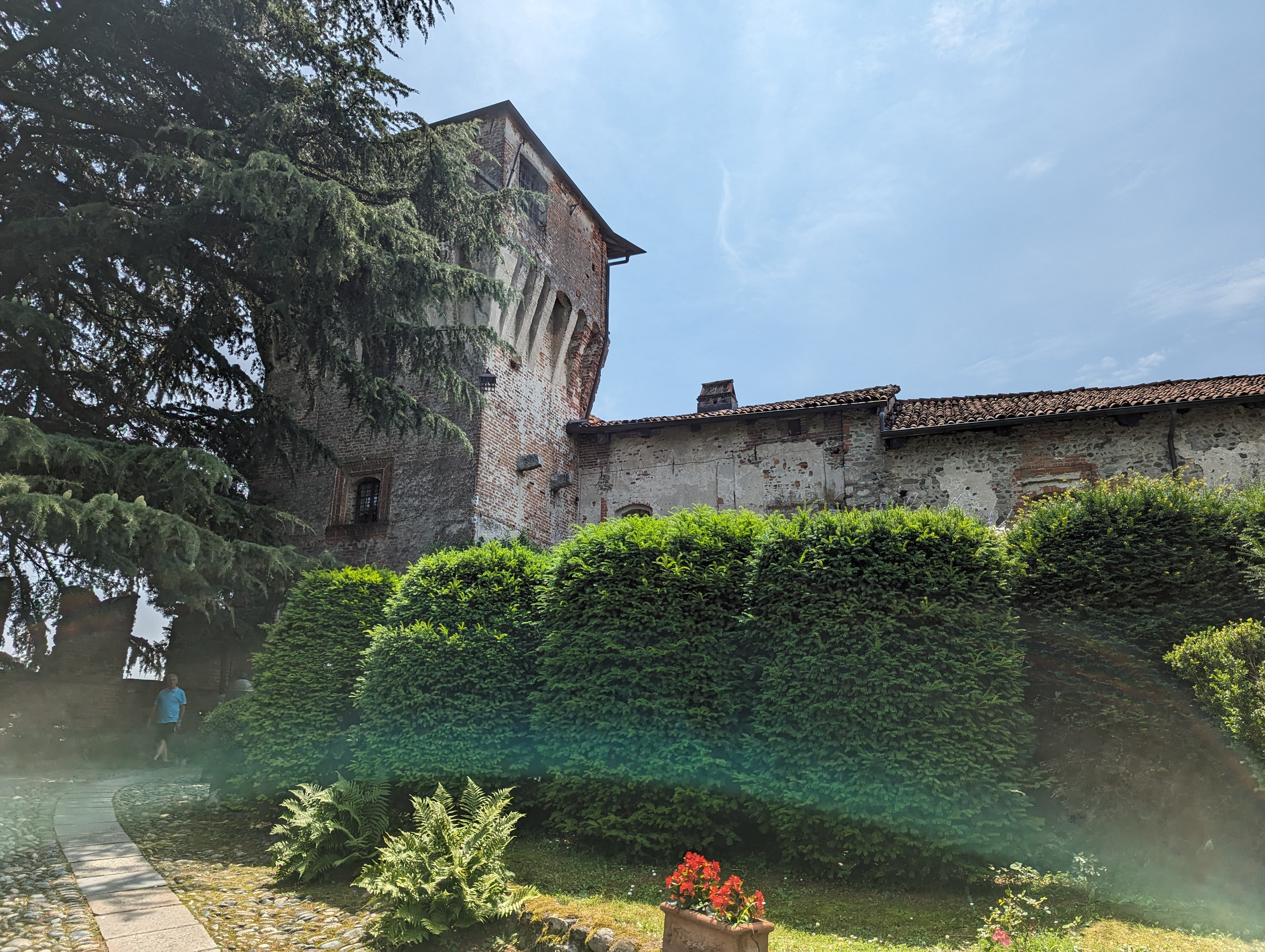
- Moncrivello Castle in 2023

Site information
- Type: Castle

Location
- Coordinates: 45°19′51.38″N 7°59′45.56″E

Moncrivello Castle (Italian: Castello di Moncrivello) is a castle located in Moncrivello, Piedmont, Italy.

== History ==
The castle dates back to around the year 1000. Having passed to the Marquises of Monferrato in 1243, the castle was reconquered by the Bishops of Vercelli in the 14th century and granted as a fief to the Fieschi counts until 1399, when the people revolted, seized it by force, and pledged allegiance to Amadeus VIII, Duke of Savoy. In the 15th century, Yolande of Valois transformed it into an elegant noble residence.

In 1908, the castle was officially recognized as a national monument. It was restored in the late 20th century.

== Gallery ==
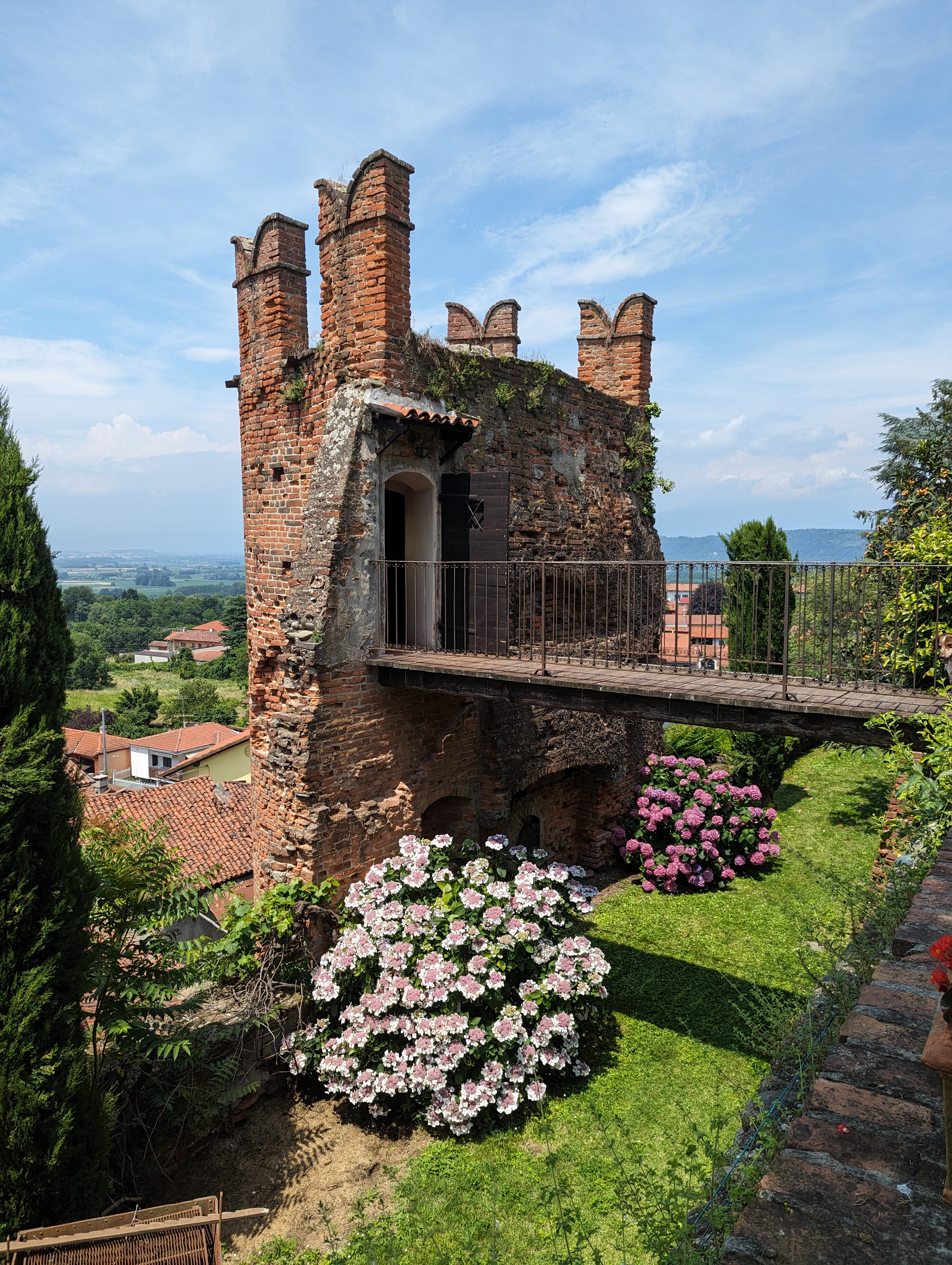

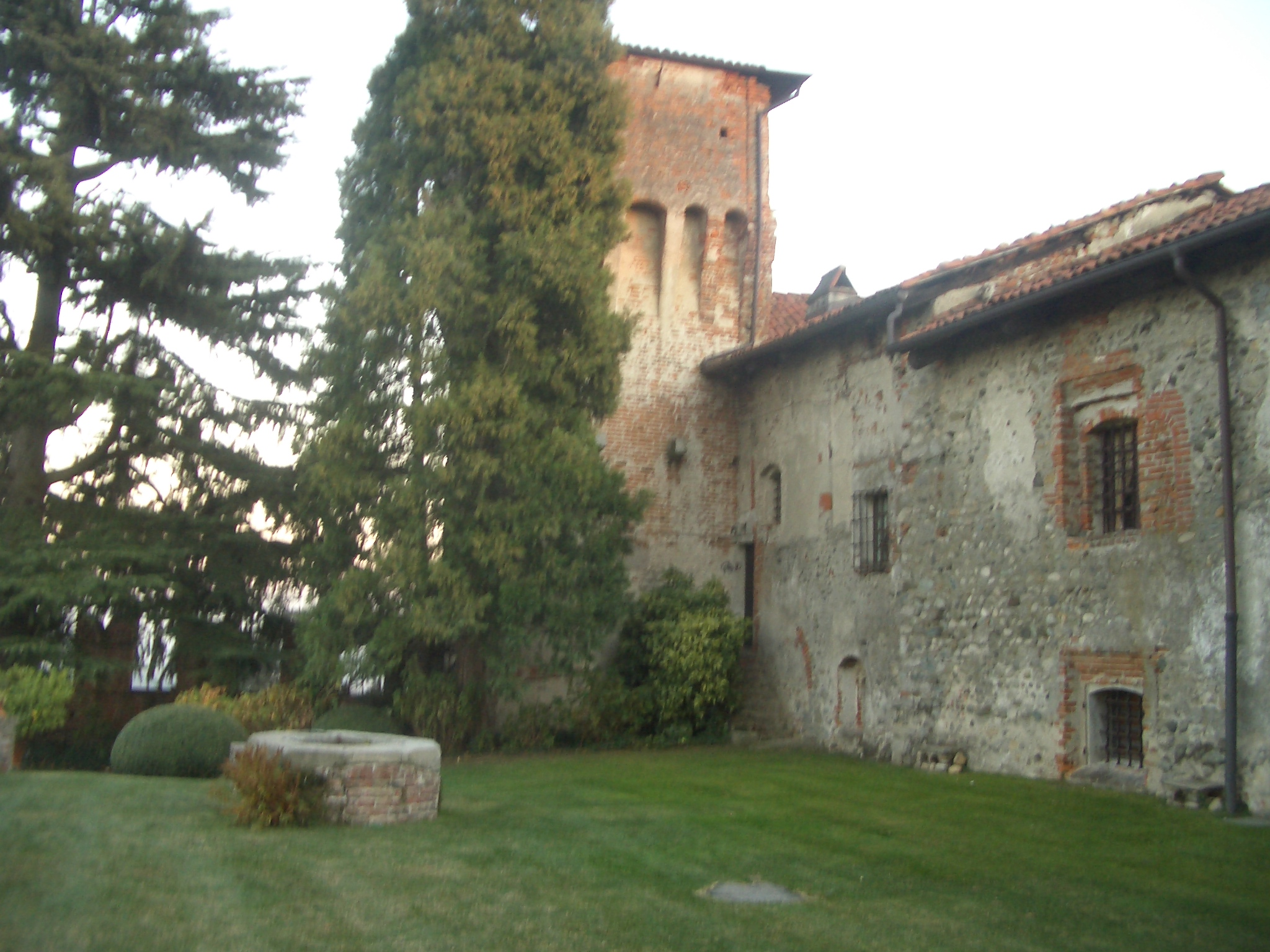

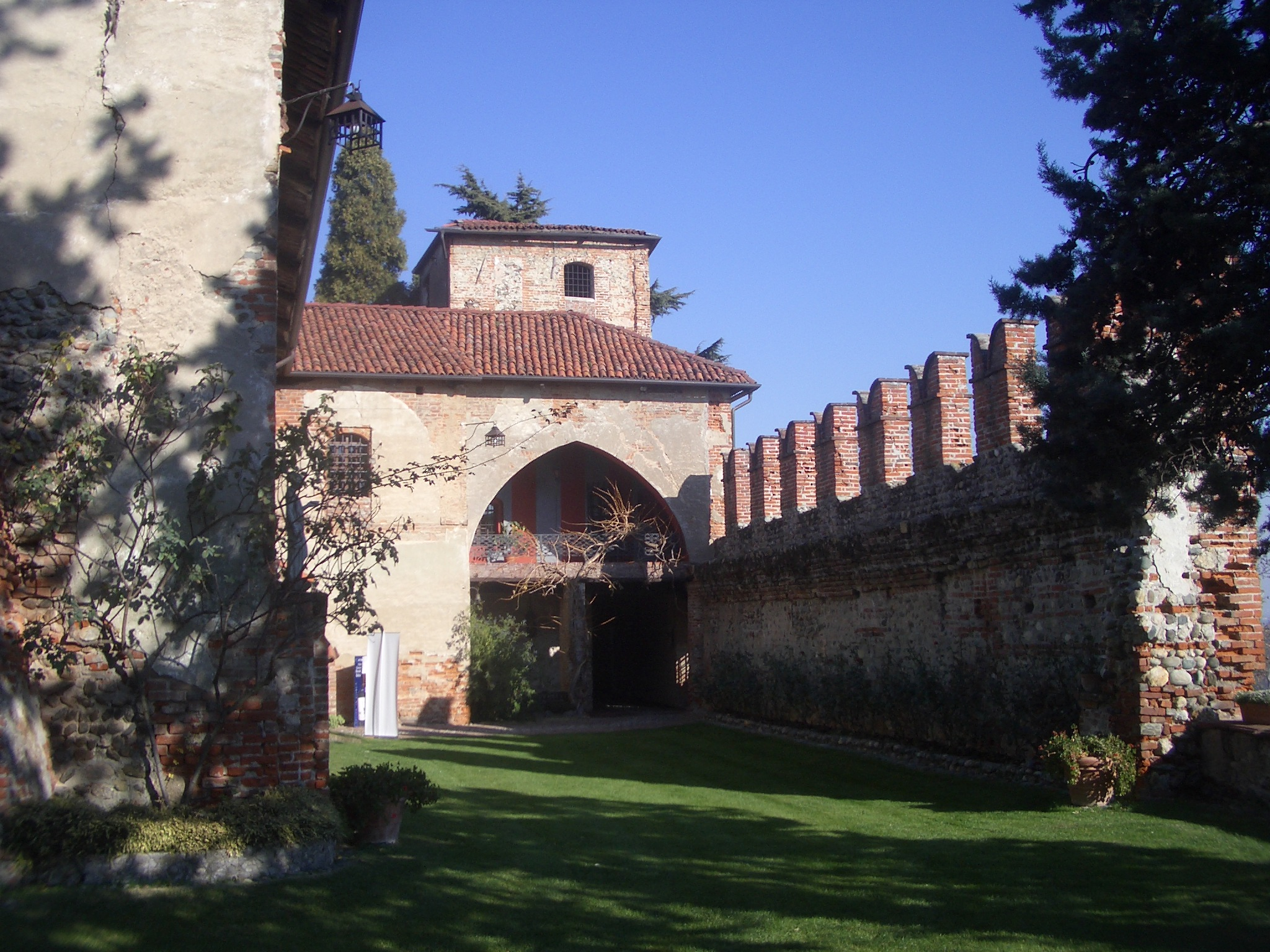
