= Moncrivello =

- Comune
- Comune di Moncrivello
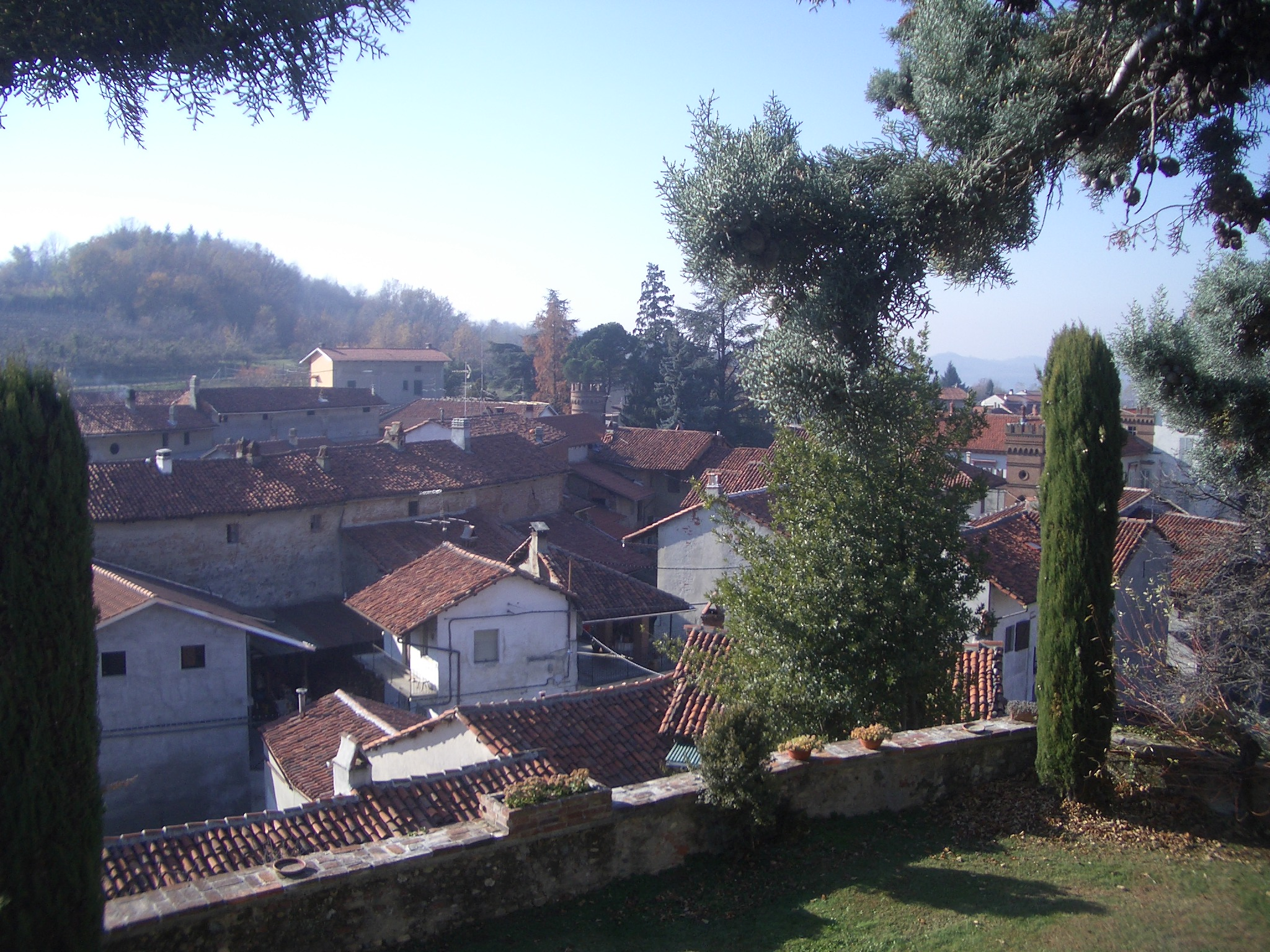
- Moncrivello seen from the castle.

- Coat of arms

- Location within Italy Location within Piedmont
- Coordinates: 45°19′N 7°59′E
- Country: Italy
- Region: Piedmont
- Province: Vercelli (VC)

Government
  - Mayor: Massimo Pissinis

Area
  - Total: 20.2 km^{2} (7.8 sq mi)
- Elevation: 206 m (676 ft)

Population (30 October 2017)
  - Total: 1,404
  - Density: 69.5/km^{2} (180/sq mi)
- Demonym: Moncrivellesi
- Time zone: UTC+1 (CET)
  - Summer (DST): UTC+2 (CEST)
- Postal code: 13040
- Dialing code: 0161
- Website: Official website

Moncrivello is a comune (municipality) in the Province of Vercelli in the Italian region Piedmont, located about 35 kilometres (22 mi) northeast of Turin and about 35 km (22 mi) west of Vercelli.

It is home to the medieval Moncrivello Castle, which was a residence of Yolande of Valois, duchess of Savoy and daughter of Charles VII of France, in the 15th century.
