= Breviary of Marie of Savoy =

15th-century illuminated manuscript

- Bréviaire de Marie de Savoie
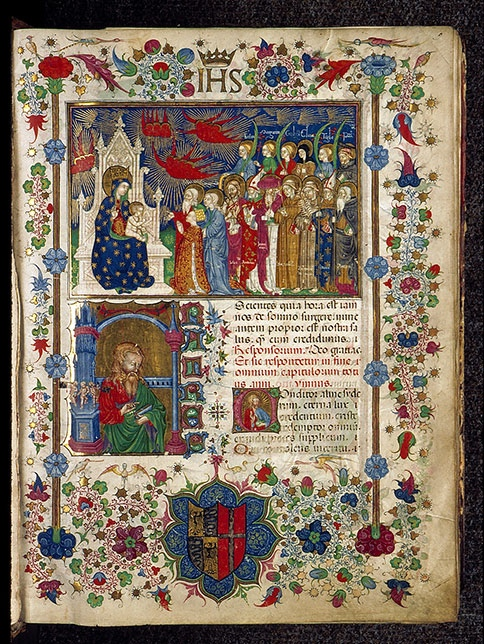
- Presentation miniature, showing the patron presented to the Holy Virgin
- Ascribed to: Master of the Vitae Imperatorum
- Patron: Marie of Savoy, Duchess of Milan
- Date: 1431–1438
- Manuscript(s): BM Chambéry Ms 4

The Breviary of Marie of Savoy (BM Chambéry Ms 4; French: Bréviaire de Marie de Savoie) is a breviary, an illuminated manuscript made for Marie of Savoy, Duchess of Milan in 1431–1438. It is profusely decorated by an Italian workshop led by an artist known by the notname of the Master of the Vitae Imperatorum. The book was lost for several centuries following the death of Marie of Savoy, and rediscovered in the attic of the castle of the Dukes of Savoy, under rubble and piles of paper, in the 1820s. It is now preserved in the Municipal library of Chambéry, France.

== History ==
The breviary was made for Marie of Savoy on occasion of her wedding with Filippo Maria Visconti, the Duke of Milan, in 1428; it appears not to have been finished before 1431–1438. The association with Mary is attested through the coat of arms that decorate the manuscript, and that carries the combined arms of the House of Savoy and the House of Visconti. Her name, together with that of her father (Amadeus VIII) and husband, furthermore appear in a short poem in the text (folio 319). Having a breviary made for such an occasion was unusual, normally a woman of Marie's status would have a decorated book of hours instead.

Following the death of her husband, Marie returned to her native Chambéry, and apparently brought the book back with her. Thereafter, the traces of the book disappear for several centuries. It was rediscovered in the 1820s in the attic of the castle of the Dukes of Savoy, under rubble and piles of paper. However it may have ended up there, the rubble protected the book from pillage, war, dust and humidity. After its rediscovery, it was brought to the Municipal library of Chambéry some time around 1828, and has since been preserved there.

The book was restored to a cost of over 5,000 euros in 2024, ahead of being lent to the Louvre for an exposition centred around the painter Jan van Eyck. After its return to Chambéry, it was then also displayed to the public in the city during the European Heritage Days in September 2024. The city of Chambéry indicated that the book would have to be in storage for at least five years following these exhibitions.

== Description ==
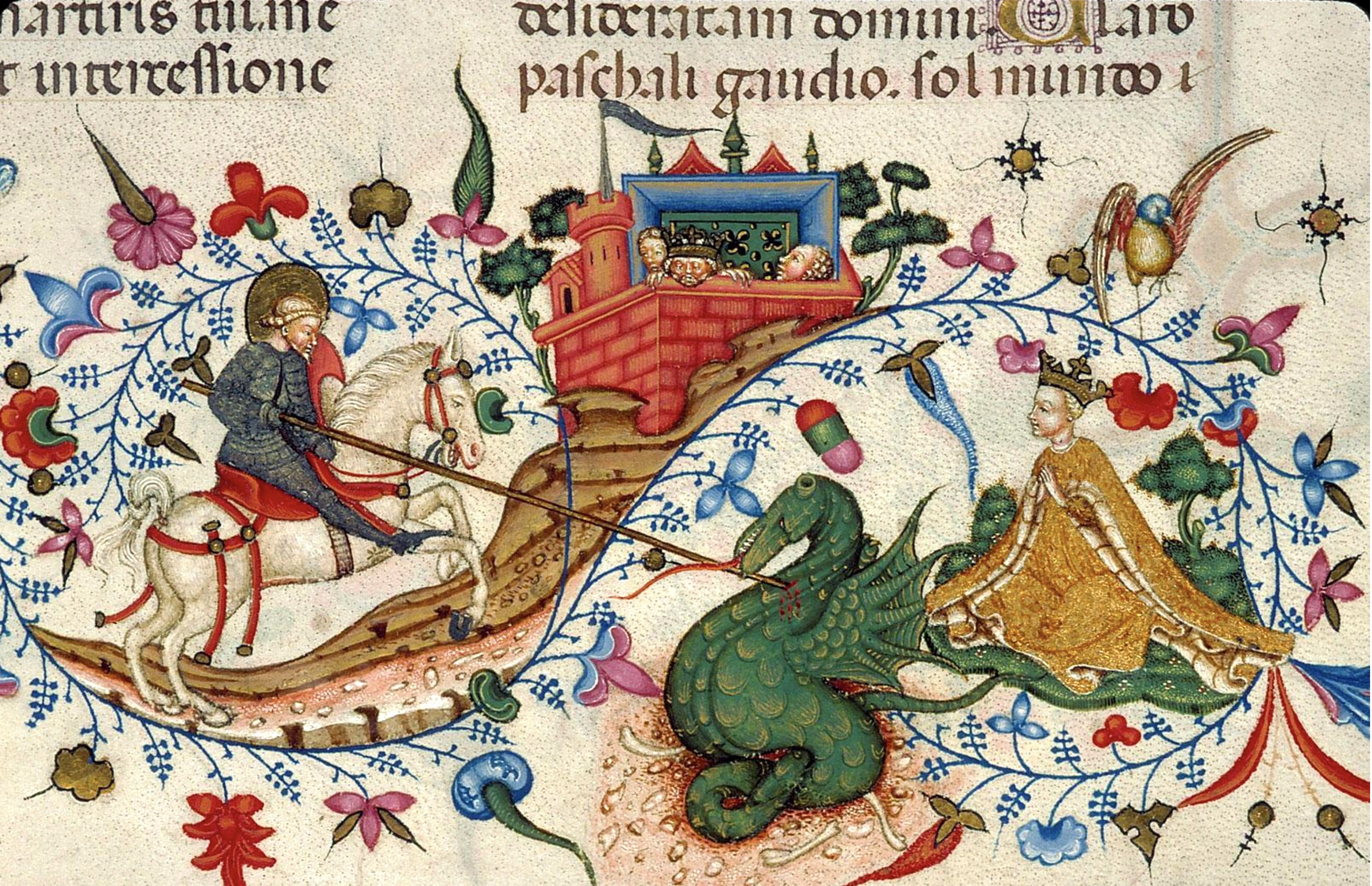
Saint George and the Dragon, elaborate drollery in the margin of the breviary

The breviary was made in the Franciscan tradition. It is profusely decorated. One of the first pages contains an unusual, large presentation miniature showing Marie of Savoy presented to the Holy Virgin by several saints; the page also contains Marie's coat of arms. The majority of the decoration of the book is in the form of 107 historiated initials, and drolleries. Art historian Victor Leroquais considered the quality shifting: some of the decoration he considered to be of remarkable quality but other elements mediocre and banal. The miniatures are painted on single-coloured or golden backgrounds, and the initials often spill over into the margins with elaborate strands of foliage and gold. The margins sometimes hold small segments of landscape, and the drolleries are often in the form of putti and wild or domesticated animals, painted with a high degree of exactitude.

Several artists of a workshop from Milan were responsible for decorating the book, the most distinguished of them an artist known by the notname of the Master of the Vitae Imperatorum, who was a favourite artist of Filippo Maria Visconti. The text is also in a north Italian style of handwriting.
