= Mary of Burgundy (disambiguation) =

Mary of Burgundy (1457–1482) was the ruler of the Burgundian State from 1477 to 1482 and the first wife of Maximilian I, Holy Roman Emperor.

Mary of Burgundy may also refer to:

- Mary of Burgundy, Duchess of Savoy (1386–1428), wife of Amadeus VIII, Duke of Savoy
- Mary of Burgundy, Duchess of Cleves (1393–1466), wife of Adolph I, Duke of Cleves
