= For All the Saints: A Prayer Book for and by the Church =

Lutheran prayer book

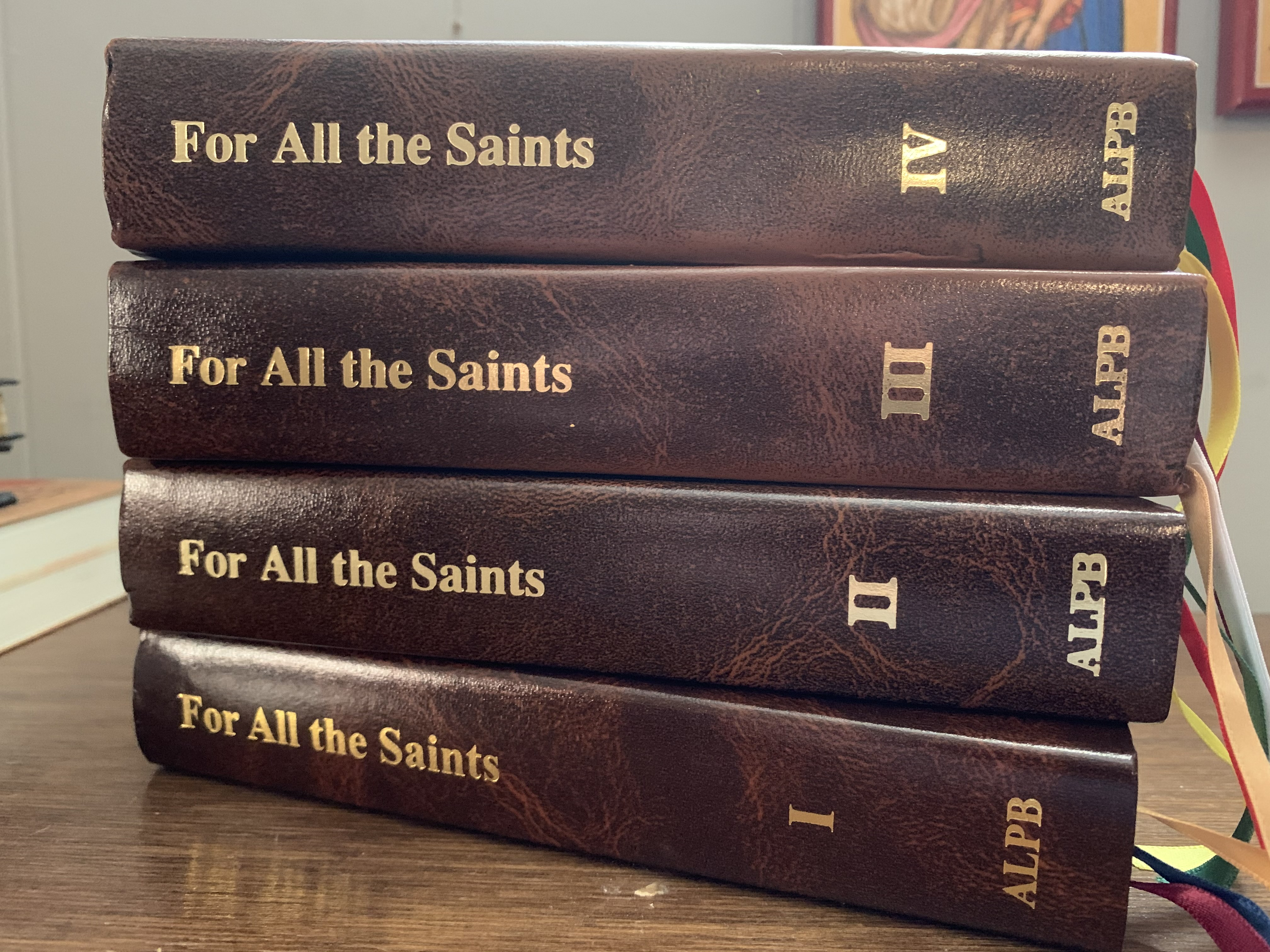
For All The Saints breviary, used in the Lutheran Churches, in four volumes

For All the Saints: A Prayer Book for and by the Church is a breviary used in the Lutheran tradition. It is used daily to pray the canonical hours at fixed prayer times. It is bound in four volumes and follows the lectionary of the Lutheran Book of Worship. For All the Saints: A Prayer Book for and by the Church has prayers and readings from the Old Testament, Epistles and Gospels with a commentary on them. The breviary covers the entire Christian Bible in a two-year cycle.

== See also ==
- The Brotherhood Prayer Book
- Lutheran religious orders
