= San Domenico, Turin =

Church and Convent of Saint Dominic
- Chiesa e Convento di San Domenico
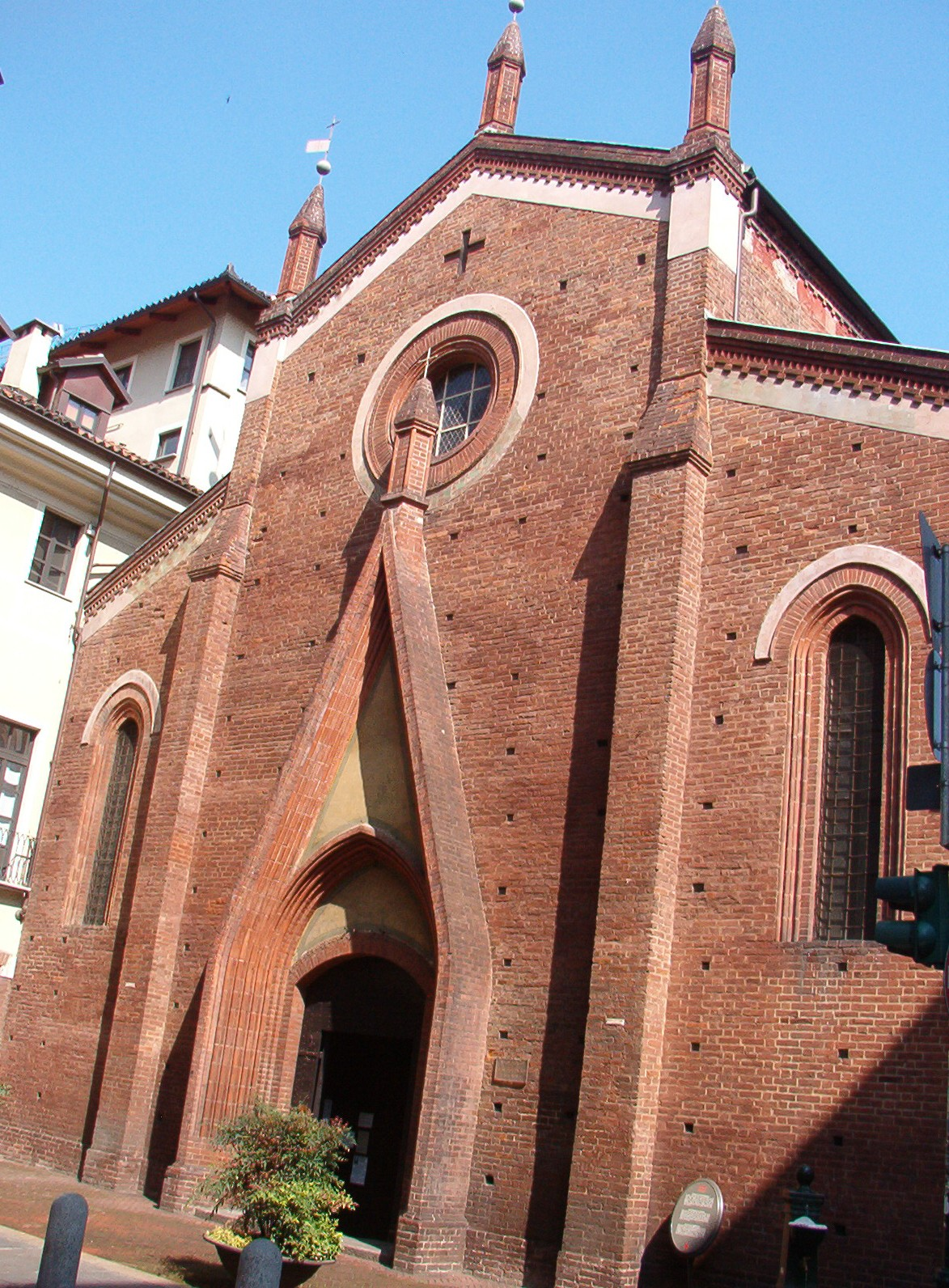
- Façade of the church

- Map of Turin
- 45.074172°N 7.68075°E
- Country: Italy
- Denomination: Roman Catholic Church

History
- Dedication: Saint Dominic

Architecture
- Style: Gothic

Administration
- Archdiocese: Turin

The Church and Convent of Saint Dominic (Italian: Chiesa e Convento di San Domenico) is a Roman Catholic church located in the city of Turin, Italy. Throughout its history it has served as a church, as inquisition tribunal, and as a masonic lodge.

== History ==
The church was built during the first half of the 13th century by Dominican friars, in gothic style. The adjacent convent was built in 1260 by Father John of Turin, who also established a library within the complex, thus making Saint Dominic, at the time, one of the cultural centers of the city. Shortly afterwards, towards the end of the 13th century, Saint Dominic became the seat of the Inquisition Tribunal of Turin, sentencing approximately 80 heretics to capital punishment throughout its existence. The façade of the building was erected in 1334, and the bell tower in 1451. During the Black Death epidemic of Turin occurring in 1630, a steel grate was placed on the entrance of the church as to allow churchgoers to attend mass without entering the building itself. During the Napoleonic period, most of the relics and precious materials in the church went missing, and the building became the seat of a Masonic lodge. It is currently the only surviving gothic building in the city.
