= Evangelisch-Lutherische Gebetsbruderschaft =

German Lutheran religious society

Evangelisch-Lutherische Gebetsbruderschaft (Evangelical Lutheran Prayer Brotherhood) is a German Lutheran religious society for men and women, based on the doctrines of the Bible and Book of Concord, with regular prayer for the renewal and unity of the Church.

Prayer Brotherhood was founded in Leipzig by Lutheran theological students. The main objectives in the beginning were Augsburg Confession, regular Eucharist on Sundays, and the daily office with mutual prayer.

The Brotherhood uses its own breviary, the Breviarium Lipsiensae: Tagzeitengebete ("Leipzig Breviary: Prayer of the Times of the Day"). It is one-volume breviary, in German with occasional Latin, containing a lectionary and four liturgical hours per day, with all 150 psalms, divided for four weeks. Musically it is descendant of the Alpirsbach movement. The Leipzig Breviary is also the main source for The Brotherhood Prayer Book of the Lutheran Liturgical Prayer Brotherhood, a confessional Lutheran confraternity based in North America; it is used to pray the canonical hours at seven fixed prayer times.

The Evangelical Lutheran Prayer Brotherhood includes members and pastors of the Evangelical Church in Germany as well as of the Independent Evangelical-Lutheran Church in Germany. The Brotherhood is led by Ältester.

== See also ==
- For All the Saints: A Prayer Book for and by the Church
