= Philibert I of Savoy =

Duke of Savoy from 1472 to 1482

Philibert I
- Coinage of Philibert I c. 1472–82

Duke of Savoy
- Reign: 30 March 1472 – 22 September 1482
- Predecessor: Amadeus IX
- Successor: Charles I
- Born: 17 August 1465; Chambéry
- Died: 22 September 1482 (aged 17); Lyons
- Spouse: Bianca Maria Sforza
- House: Savoy
- Father: Amadeus IX, Duke of Savoy
- Mother: Yolande of Valois

Coat of Arms of the Dukes of Savoy

Philibert I (17 August 1465, Chambéry – 22 September 1482), surnamed the Hunter, was the son of Amadeus IX, Duke of Savoy and Yolande of Valois. Philibert was Duke of Savoy from 1472 to 1482.

After his father's death in 1472, his mother became regent. Philibert was betrothed to Bianca Maria Sforza, daughter of Galeazzo Maria Sforza of Milan, by his second wife, Bona of Savoy, in 1474. (Note: Joni Hand states they were married in 1476.) They had no children.

Initially kidnapped by Savoyard noblemen and held at Turin, the intervention of Louis XI of France led to Philibert's release. He died from tuberculosis, in Lyons, at the age of 17 and the duchy was inherited by his younger brother Charles.

== Sources ==
- Abulafia, David (1995). The French Descent into Renaissance Italy, 1494–1495: Antecedents and Effects. Routledge.
- Hand, Joni M. (2013). Women, Manuscripts and Identity in Northern Europe, 1350-1550. Ashgate Publishing.
- Lubkin, Gregory (1994). A Renaissance Court: Milan Under Galleazzo Maria Sforza. University of California Press.

Philibert I of Savoy House of Savoy Born: 17 August 1465 Died: 22 September 1482
Regnal titles
Preceded by Amadeus IX	Duke of Savoy; 1472–1482	Succeeded by Charles I
