= Antoine de Lonhy =

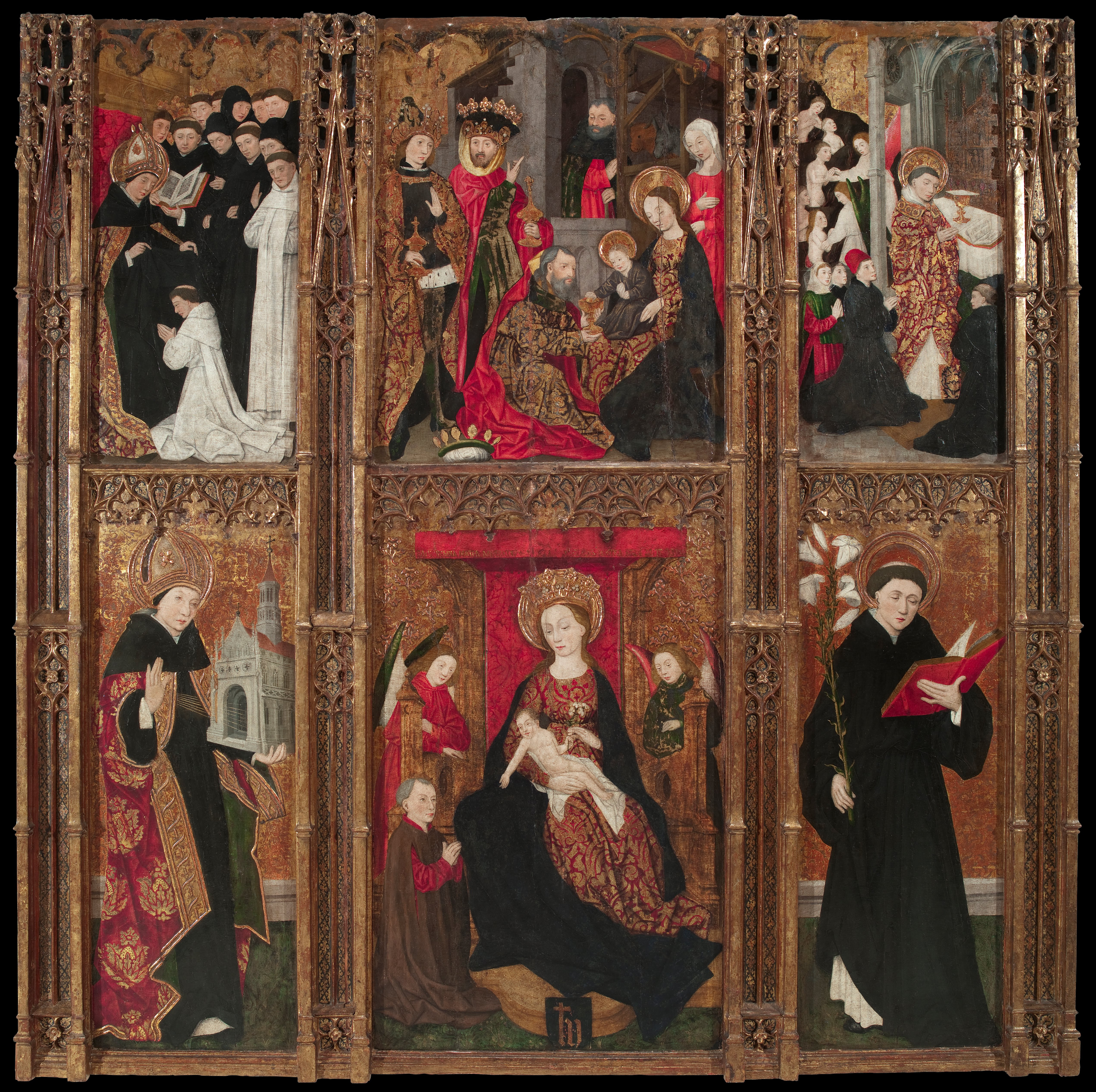
Antoine de Lonhy, Altarpiece of the Virgin, Saint Augustine and Saint Nicholas of Tolentino, currently in the Museu Nacional d'Art de Catalunya, Barcelona

Antoine de Lonhy (fl. circa 1446–1490) was a painter, illuminator and designer of stained glass windows.

He received training in Burgundy, where he was also active as an artist before moving to Toulouse, Barcelona and later Savoy. He decorated the Saluces Hours, a book of hours currently in the British Library. In Barcelona, he designed an altarpiece and a rose window for the church of Santa Maria del Mar.
