= Breviary =

Liturgical book used in Christianity to pray the canonical hours

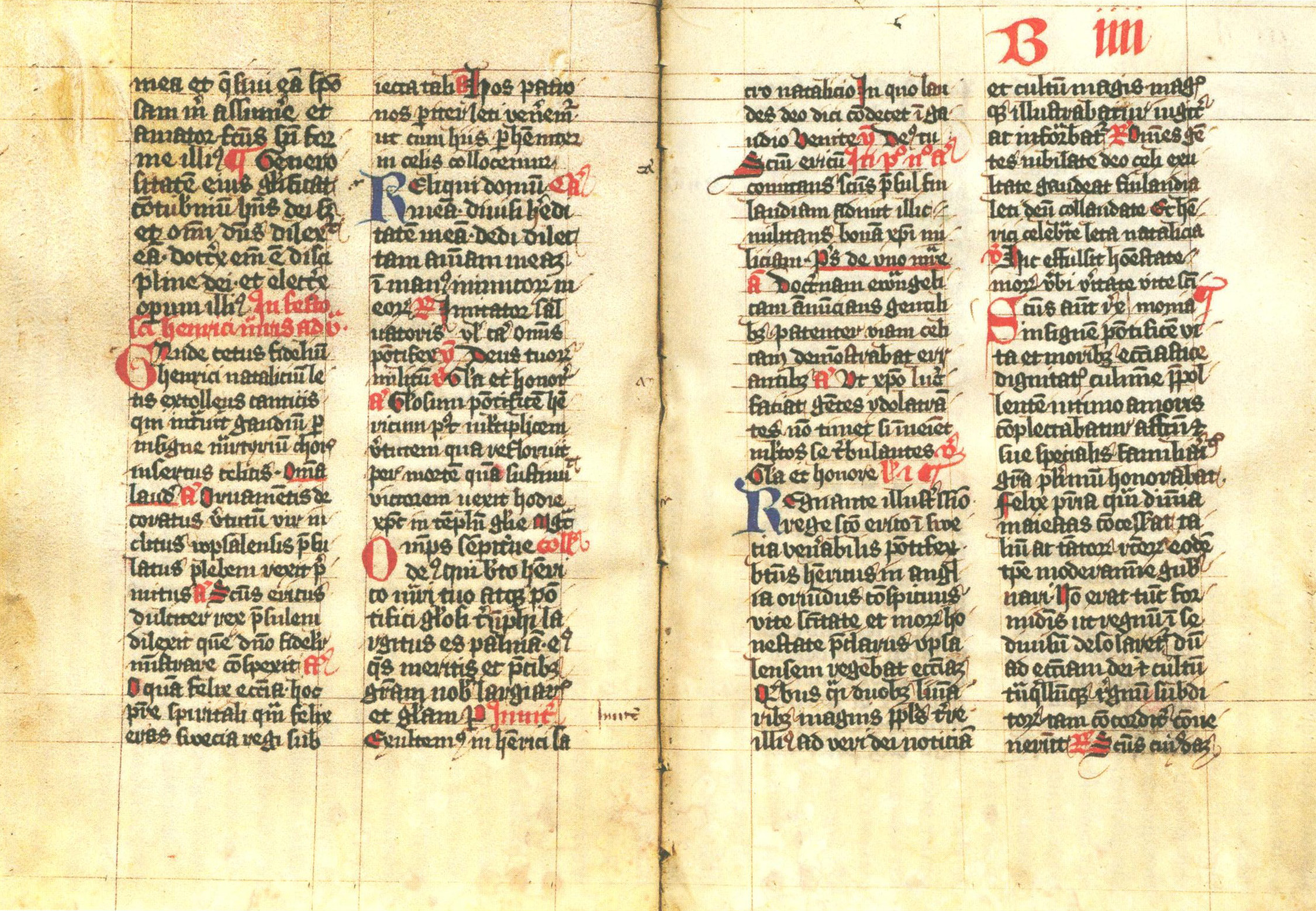
Pages from a breviary used in the Swedish Diocese of Strängnäs in the 15th century

A breviary (Latin: breviarium) is a liturgical book used in Christianity for praying the canonical hours, usually recited at seven fixed prayer times.

Historically, different breviaries were used in the various parts of Christendom, such as the Aberdeen Breviary, although eventually the Roman Breviary became the standard within the Roman Catholic Church (though it was later supplanted with the Liturgy of the Hours); in other Christian denominations such as the Lutheran churches, different breviaries continue to be used, such as The Brotherhood Prayer Book.

During the Middle Ages, breviaries were sometimes artistically decorated. Exceptional examples include the Belleville Breviary, Mayer van den Bergh Breviary, Isabella Breviary, Stowe Breviary, and the Breviary of Marie of Savoy.

== History and usage ==
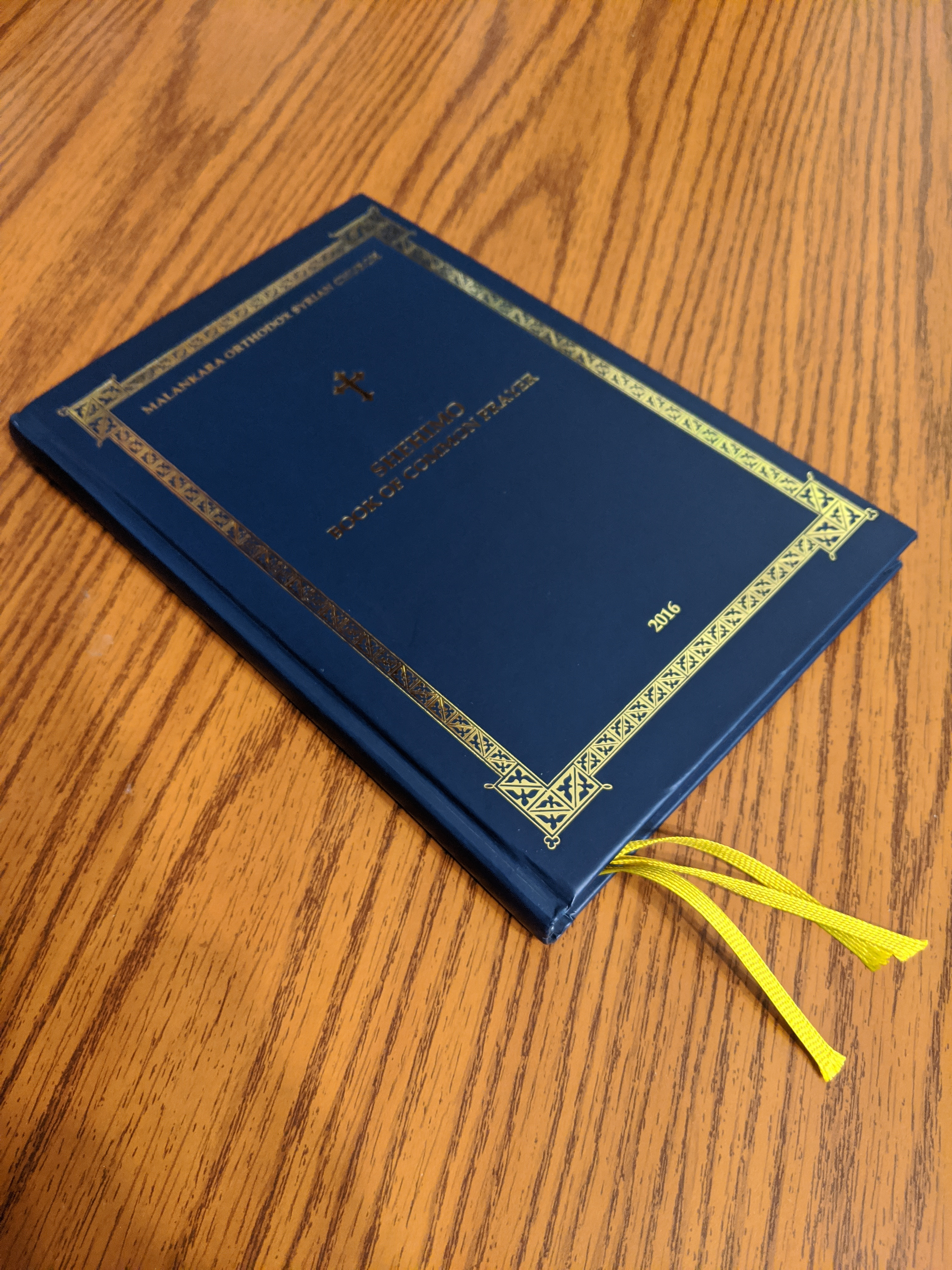
The Shehimo Book of Common Prayer is the breviary used in the Malankara Orthodox Syrian Church.

The "contents of the breviary, in their essential parts, are derived from the early ages of Christianity", consisting of psalms, Scripture lessons, writings of the Church Fathers, as well as hymns and prayers. From the time of the early Church, the practice of seven fixed prayer times, being attached to Psalm 119:164, have been taught; in Apostolic Tradition, Hippolytus instructed Christians to pray seven times a day "on rising, at the lighting of the evening lamp, at bedtime, at midnight" and "the third, sixth and ninth hours of the day, being hours associated with Christ's Passion." The Apostles themselves gave significance to prayer times (e.g. Acts 3:1 and Acts 10:9).

In the Catholic Church, Pope Nicholas III approved a Franciscan breviary, for use in that religious order, and this was the first text that bore the title of breviary. An example of a decorated Franciscan breviary is the 15th-century Breviary of Marie of Savoy. The ancient breviary of the Bridgettines had been in use for more than 125 years before the Council of Trent and so was exempt from the Constitution of Pope Pius V which abolished the use of breviaries differing from that of Rome. In 2015, The Syon Breviary of the Bridgettines was published for the first time in English (from Latin). This was done in celebration of the 600th anniversary of Syon Abbey, founded in 1415 by King Henry V.

In Evangelical Lutheranism, various traditional breviaries enjoy usage, such as the Evangelical Lutheran Breviary, The Brotherhood Prayer Book, and Oremus: a Lutheran Breviary. The Diakonie Neuendettelsau religious institute uses a breviary unique to the order. For All the Saints: A Prayer Book for and by the Church, among many other breviaries such as The Daily Office: Matins and Vespers, Based on Traditional Liturgical Patterns, with Scripture Readings, Hymns, Canticles, Litanies, Collects, and the Psalter, Designed for Private Devotion or Group Worship, are popular in Evangelical Lutheran usage as well.

Following the Oxford Movement in the Anglican Communion, in 1916, the Anglican Breviary was published by the Frank Gavin Liturgical Foundation.

In Oriental Orthodox Christianity, the canonical hours of the Syriac Orthodox Church and the Indian Orthodox Church are contained within the Shehimo breviary; the Coptic Orthodox Church of Alexandria has the Agpeya breviary and the Armenian Apostolic Church has the Sharagnots or Zhamagirk (cf. Octoechos (liturgy)#Armenian Šaraknoc'). The Assyrian Church of the East has its own 7 canonical hours.

In the Eastern Orthodox Church, the Divine Office is found in the Horologion, which consists of eight canonical hours: Vespers (sunset), Compline (before sleep), Midnight Office, Orthros (sunrise), 1st hour (07:00), 3rd hour (09:00), 6th hour (12:00), and 9th hour (15:00).

== See also ==
- Book of hours
- Christian liturgy
- Direction of prayer
- Fixed prayer times
- Hygiene in Christianity
- Missal
