= Yolande of Valois =

Duchess of Savoy from 1465 to 1472

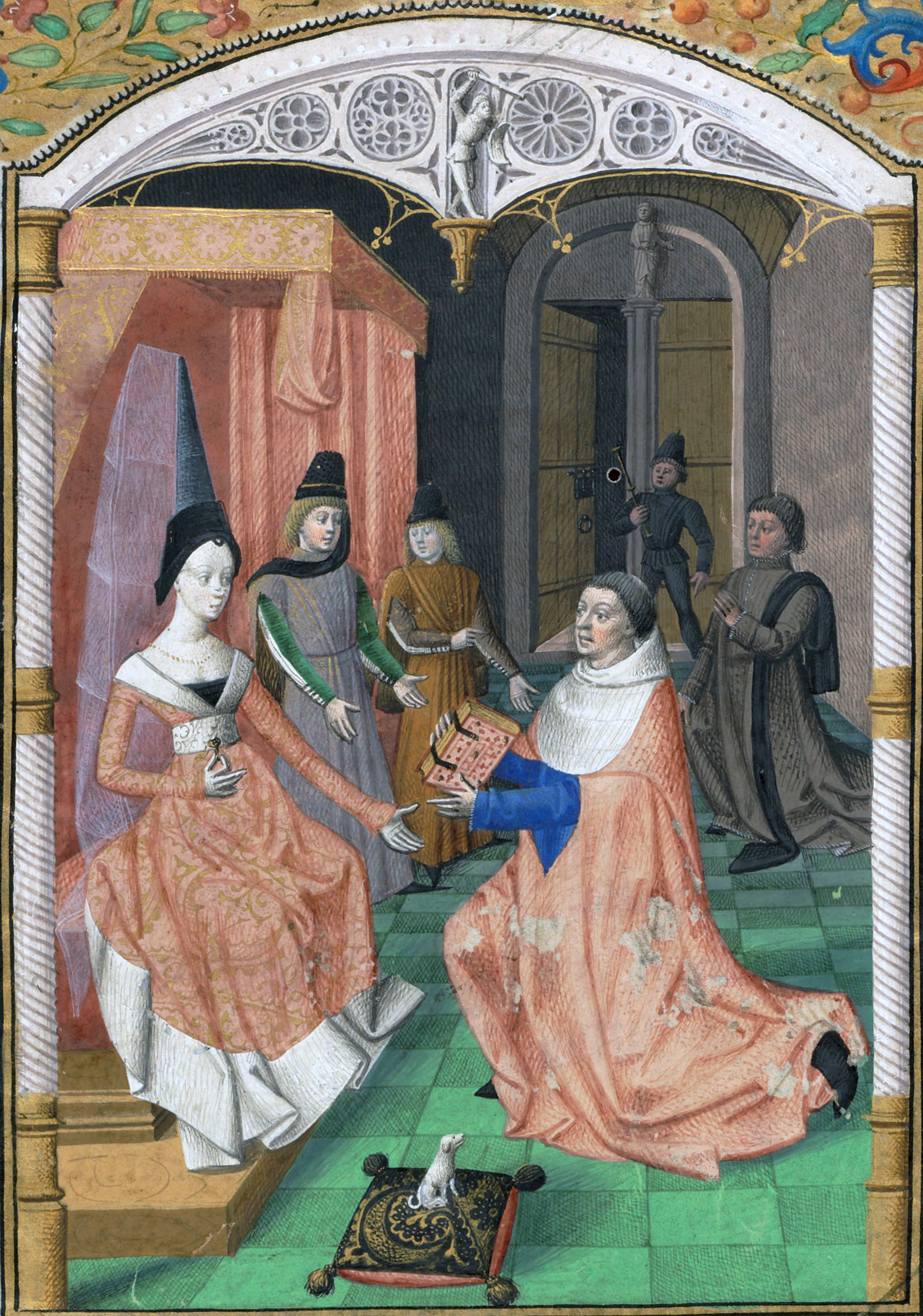
- Dedication by the theologian Guillaume Fichet of his book Rhetorica to Yolande of France, Duchess of Savoy (1471)

Duchess consort of Savoy
- Tenure: 29 January 1465 – 30 March 1472
- Born: 23 September 1434; Tours
- Died: 23 August 1478 (aged 43); Chambéry
- Spouse: Amadeus IX, Duke of Savoy
- Issue: Anne, Princess of Squillace; Louise; Philibert I, Duke of Savoy; Charles I, Duke of Savoy
- House: Valois
- Father: Charles VII of France
- Mother: Marie of Anjou

Yolande of Valois (23 September 1434 – 23 August 1478), also called Yolande of France, was a princess of the House of Valois who became Duchess of Savoy by marriage to Duke Amadeus IX of Savoy, and regent of Savoy during the minority of her son Philibert I from 1472 until 1478.

== Life ==
Yolande was a daughter of King Charles VII of France, "The Victorious," and Marie of Anjou. She was named after her grandmother, Yolande of Aragon. At the age of two, Yolande was betrothed to Louis, Duke of Savoy, the agreement being signed at Tours.

Yolande married Duke Amadeus IX of Savoy in 1452. After her wedding, she brought three chests of books with her. Yolande's husband became duke of Savoy in 1465, making her duchess. Her husband's retiring disposition and epilepsy left her in control of the state, to struggle with the Savoyard barons.

=== Regency ===
After the death of her spouse in March 1472, Yolande became regent for her son Philibert until her own death. Like her brother Charles, she was an ally to Charles the Bold, Duke of Burgundy, against her own brother King Louis XI. After the humiliation of Burgundy at the Battle of Grandson in 1476, the duke accused her of being in league with Louis and imprisoned her. After her release, she made peace with her brother and remained on good terms with him until her death. She is said to have been one of the very few women whose intelligence he respected.

Yolanda was the first person in Europe to own a tiger, keeping one in a castle in Turin in 1478.

== Issue ==
Yolande and Amadeus had:

1. Louis of Savoy (1453)
2. Anne of Savoy (1455-1480), married Frederick of Naples (1452-1504), prince of Altamura
3. Charles of Savoy (1456-1471), Prince of Piedmont
4. Maria of Savoy (1460-1511) married Philip of Hachberg-Sausenberg (1454–1503)
5. Louise of Savoy (1462-1503), married in 1479 to Hugh de Chalon
6. Philibert I, Duke of Savoy (1465-1482)
7. Bernard of Savoy (1467)
8. Charles I, Duke of Savoy (1468-1490)
9. James Louis of Savoy (1470-1485), Count of the Genevois, France
10. John Claude Galeazzo of Savoy (1472)

== Ancestry ==
Ancestors of Yolande of Valois

8. Charles V of France
4. Charles VI of France
9. Joanna of Bourbon
2. Charles VII of France
10. Stephen III, Duke of Bavaria
5. Isabeau of Bavaria
11.Taddaea Visconti
1. Princess Yolande of France
12. Louis I, Duke of Anjou
6. Louis II of Naples
13. Marie of Blois
3. Marie of Anjou
14. John I of Aragon
7. Yolande of Aragon
15. Violante de Bar

== Sources ==
- Ashdown-Hill, John (2016). The Private Life of Edward IV. Amberley Publishing.
- Bell, Susan Groag (1988). "Medieval Women Book Owners: Arbiters of Lay Piety and Ambassadors of Culture". In Erler, Mary; Kowaleski, Maryanne (eds.). Women and Power in the Middle Ages. The University of Georgia Press. pp. 149–187.
- Bruening, Michael W. (2016). "Francophone Territories Allied to the Swiss Confederation". In Burnett, Amy Nelson; Campi, Emidio (eds.). A Companion to the Swiss Reformation. Brill. pp. 362–388.
- Merle, Michel (2013). "The Model of the Holy Savoyard Prince". In Vester, Matthew (ed.). Sabaudian Studies: Political Culture, Dynasty, & Territory, 1400-1700. Truman State University Press. pp. 151–166.
- Pluskowski, Aleksander (2009). "What is exotic? Sources of Animals and Animal Products from the Edges of the Medieval World". In Jaritz, Gerhard; Kreem, Juhan (eds.). The Edges of the Medieval World. Central European University Press. pp. 113–129.
- Vale, M.G.A. (1974). Charles VII. University of California Press.
- Vester, Matthew (2013). "The Sabaudian Lands and Sabaudian Studies". In Vester, Matthew (ed.). Sabaudian Studies: Political Culture, Dynasty, & Territory, 1400-1700. Truman State University Press. pp. 1–12.
- Vaughan, Richard (2004). Charles the Bold: The Last Valois Duke of Burgundy. The Boydell Press.

Yolande of Valois House of Valois Cadet branch of the Capetian dynasty Born: 23 September 1434 Died: 23 August 1478
Royal titles
Vacant Title last held by Anne of Cyprus	Duchess consort of Savoy; 1465–1472	Vacant Title next held by Bianca Maria Sforza
