= Mary of Burgundy, Duchess of Savoy =

Mary of Burgundy
- Duchess consort of Savoy
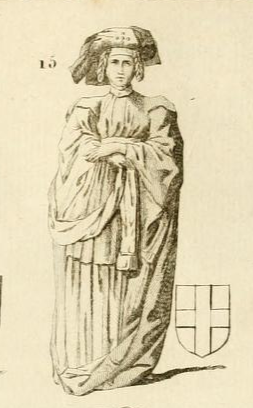
- Born: 1386; Dijon, Burgundy
- Died: 1428 (aged 41–42); Chateau of Thonon les Bains
- Spouse: Amadeus VIII of Savoy (m. 1386)
- Issue (among others): Margaret, Countess Palatine of the Rhine; Marie, Duchess of Milan; Louis of Savoy
- House: House of Valois-Burgundy; House of Savoy
- Father: Philip the Bold
- Mother: Margaret III, Countess of Flanders

Mary of Burgundy (French: Marie de Bourgogne; 1386–1428) was a Duchess consort of Savoy by her marriage to Duke Amadeus VIII of Savoy, who was later known as Antipope Felix V.

== Life ==
Mary was born in 1386, most likely in September, in Dijon, France. She was the eighth of the nine children of Philip the Bold, Duke of Burgundy, and his wife Margaret III, Countess of Flanders.

From her birth, Mary's father intended her to marry Amadeus VIII of Savoy, son of Amadeus VII, Count of Savoy and Bonne of Berry. Their marriage was contracted in the year of her birth, on 11 November 1386 in Sluis, Zeeland; they married by proxy 30 October 1393 in Chalon-sur-Saône and in person at Arras in May 1401, when Mary was around 15 years old. However, she did not arrive in Savoy until she was 17, in September 1403.

In 1416, Sigismund, then King of the Romans elevated Amadeus from Count to Duke of Savoy. Mary duly became Duchess. From then onwards Dukes ruled over Savoy.

The couple were married for thirty-six years before Mary died in the beginning of October 1428 (Note: Max Bruchet states Mary died in the early days of October 1422.) at Chateau of Thonon-les-Bains. She is buried in the Abbey of Hautecombe.

== Issue ==
Mary and Amadeus had nine children, only four of whom lived to mature adulthood.

1. Margaret of Savoy (13 May 1405 – 1418).
2. Anthony of Savoy (September 1407 – bef. 12 December 1407).
3. Anthony of Savoy (1408 – aft. 10 October 1408).
4. Marie of Savoy (end January 1411 – 22 February 1469), married Filippo Maria Visconti, duke of Milan.
5. Amadeus of Savoy (26 Mar 1412 – 17 August 1431), Prince of Piemonte, Amadeus' heir apparent until his premature death.
6. Louis of Savoy (24 February 1413 – 29 January 1465), Duke of Savoy, he married Anne of Cyprus in 1432 and had issue.
7. Bonne of Savoy (September 1415 – 25 September 1430), betrothed at the age of 11 to Francis I, Duke of Brittany, she died at 15 before the marriage could take place.
8. Margaret of Savoy (7 August 1420 – 30 September 1479), married firstly Louis III of Anjou, titular king of Naples, and had no issue; secondly Louis IV, Count Palatine of the Rhine and had issue; and thirdly Ulrich V, Count of Württemberg and had issue.
9. Philip of Savoy (1422 – 3 March 1444), Count of Genève.

== Sources ==
- Bruchet, Max (1907). Le château de Ripaille (in French). C. Delagrave (Paris). p. 86.
- Chaubet, Daniel (1984). "Une enquête historique en Savoie au XVe siècle". Journal des Savants. 1 (122): 93–125. doi:10.3406/jds.1984.1477 – via French.
- Galland, Bruno (1998). Les papes d'Avignon et la Maison de Savoie : 1309-1409 (in French). Rome: Publications de l'École Française de Rome. p. 340. ISBN 978-2-7283-0539-1.
- Vaughan, Richard (2005). Philip the Bold: The Formation of the Burgundian State. The Boydell Press.

Preceded by Bonne of Berry as countess	Duchess of Savoy; 1403–1422	Succeeded by Anne of Cyprus
