= Amadeus VIII of Savoy =

Savoyard nobleman and antipope (1383–1451)

Antipope Felix V
- Miniature of Amadeus VIII as Duke of Savoy (in the centre), c. 1430–35

Count of Savoy
- Reign: 1391–1416
- Predecessor: Amadeus VII
- Successor: Title abolished
- Regent: Bonne of Bourbon (1391–1397)

Duke of Savoy
- Reign: 1416–1440
- Predecessor: Title established
- Successor: Louis I
- Regent: Louis I (c. 1434 – 5 February 1440)
- Born: Amadeus of Savoy; 4 September 1383; Chambéry
- Died: 7 January 1451 (aged 67); Geneva
- Spouse: Mary of Burgundy (m. 1386; died 1428)
- Issue (among others): Marie; Louis I; Margaret
- House: Savoy
- Father: Amadeus VII, Count of Savoy
- Mother: Bonne of Berry
- Church: Catholic Church
- Papacy began: 24 July 1440
- Papacy ended: 7 April 1449
- Predecessor: Eugene IV; Roman claimant:
- Opposed to: Pope Eugene IV; Pope Nicholas V

Orders
- Consecration: 24 July 1440

Personal details
- Coat of arms: Amadeus VIII of Savoy's coat of arms

Amadeus VIII (4 September 1383 – 7 January 1451), nicknamed the Peaceful, was Count of Savoy from 1391 to 1416 and Duke of Savoy from 1416 to 1440. He was the first to hold the ducal title, granted by Emperor Sigismund. Known for his diplomatic temperament and administrative reforms, he strengthened the state's institutions and fostered internal peace.

He also claimed the papacy from 1439 to 1449 as Antipope Felix V, (Note: When numbering of the popes began to be used, Antipope Felix II was counted as one of the popes of that name. The second official Pope Felix is thus known by the number III, and the third was given the number IV. It also affected the name taken by Amadeus, who would have been the fourth Pope Felix.) in opposition to Popes Eugene IV and Nicholas V, becoming the last historical antipope recognised by a significant portion of the Catholic clergy.

== Count and duke ==
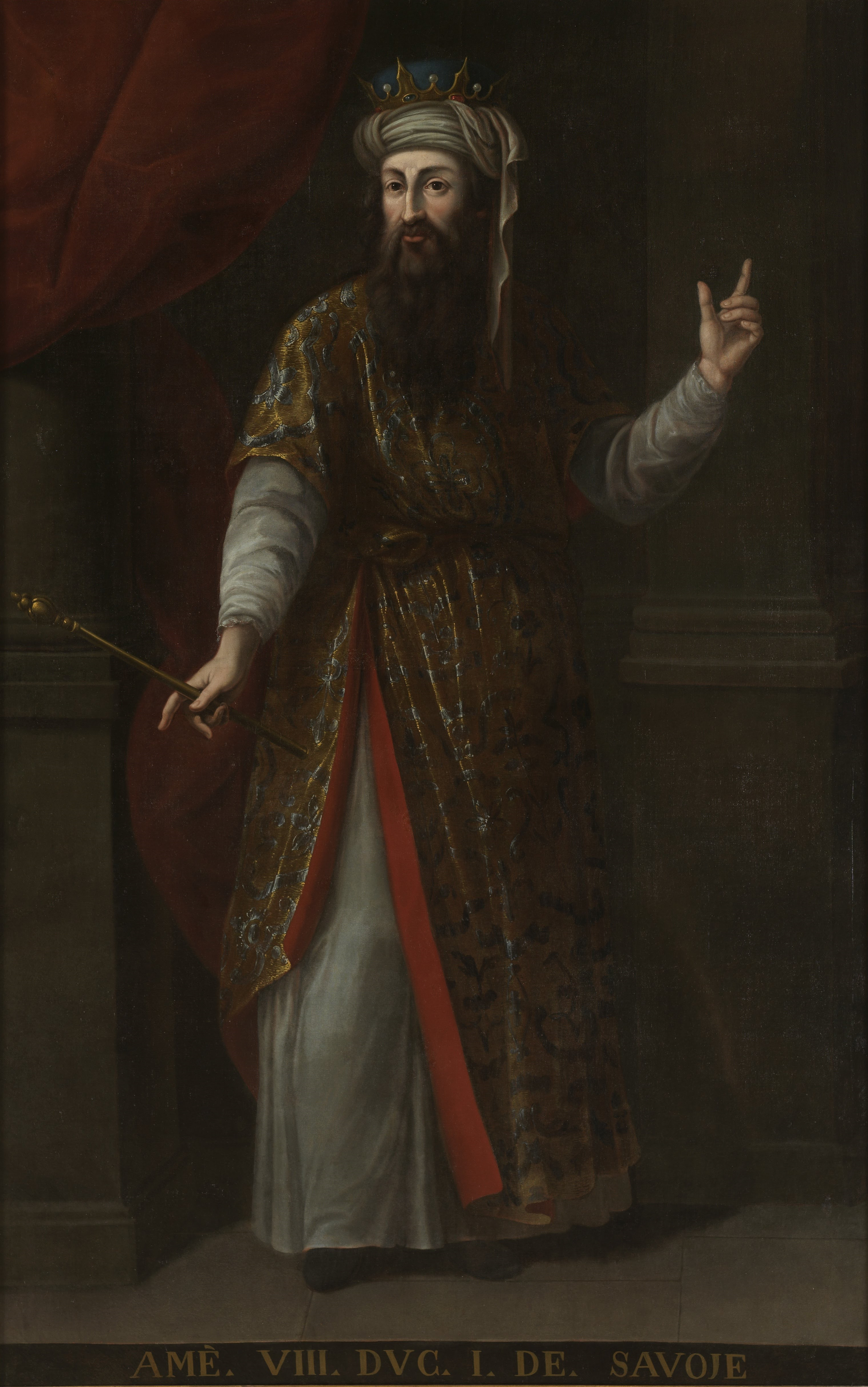
18th century Portrait of Amadeus VIII

Amadeus was born in Chambéry on 4 September 1383, the son of Amadeus VII, Count of Savoy and Bonne of Berry. Even as a boy, he suffered from strabismus, which one of his father's physicians, Jean de Grandville, claimed he could cure. He became Count of Savoy in 1391 after his father's death on 2 November 1391, caused (it was said) by poisoning, or at least bad treatment at the hands of his physicians. In his testament, the Red Count, Amadeus VII, had appointed his mother Bonne of Bourbon rather than his wife Bonne of Berry, niece of King Charles VI of France, as regent for Amadeus VIII. This set off a struggle at the court between the grandmother and the mother, eventually involving the dukes of Berry, Bourbon, Orléans, and King Charles VI of France. Amadeus VIII's grandmother acted as regent until 1397, during his minority.

The Count's early rule saw the centralisation of power and the territorial expansion of the Savoyard state, and in 1416 Amadeus was elevated by Sigismund, King of the Romans to Duke of Savoy. In 1418, his distant cousin Louis of Piedmont, his brother-in-law, the last male of the elder branch of House of Savoy, died, leaving Amadeus as his heir-general, thus finally uniting the male lines of the House of Savoy.

Amadeus increased his dominions and encouraged several attempts to negotiate an end to the Hundred Years' War. From 1401 to 1422, he campaigned to recover the area around Geneva and Annecy. After the death of his wife in 1428, he founded the Order of Saint Maurice with six other knights in 1434. They lived alone in the castle of Ripaille, near Geneva, in a quasi-monastic state according to a rule drawn up by himself. He styled himself Decanus Militum solitudinis Ripalliae. He appointed his son Louis regent of the duchy.

== Pope of the Council of Basel ==
Amadeus was sympathetic to conciliarism, the movement to have the Church managed by Ecumenical councils, and to prelates like Cardinal Louis Aleman of Arles, who wanted to set limits upon the doctrine of papal supremacy. He had close relations with the Council of Basel (1431–1449), even after most of its members joined the Council of Florence, convened by Pope Eugene IV in 1438.

There is no evidence that he intrigued to obtain the papal office by sending the bishops of Savoy to Basel, though he did suggest that the bishops of Savoy attend the Council. Of the twelve bishops present, seven were Savoyards.

In its Session XXXI, on 24 January 1438, the Council of Basel suspended Pope Eugene. Then, on 25 June 1439, it formally deposed Eugene as a heretic. The president of the Council, Cardinal Louis Aleman, the Archbishop of Arles, reminded the members that they needed to elect a rich and powerful pope to defend it from its adversaries.

=== Election ===
Since Aleman was the only cardinal present, the Council decided to appoint a college of electors. consisting of thirty-three members, chosen from the five "nations" into which the council was divided. They entered into a conclave on 31 October 1439. In the first scrutiny (ballot), Amadeus received 16 votes; in the second, 19 votes; in the third, 21. On 5 November, he received 26 votes, sufficient to be elected. The Council itself then issued a decree on 17 November 1439, stating that Amadeus had been elected pope and giving the full details of the election.

A delegation, which included the secretary and notary Aeneas Silvius Piccolomini, was sent to Ripaille, the residence of Amadeus. It arrived on 15 December 1439, and, after long negotiations, Amadeus acquiesced in his election on 5 February 1440. The choice of the papal name, Felix, was suggested by Cardinal Aleman. Felix took the inaugural oath formulated by the Council of Basel. At the same time, he completely renounced all further participation in the government of his domains; he named his son Louis the Duke of Savoy, and his son Philip the Count of Geneva. He also appointed Piccolomini as his secretary.

=== Pope ===
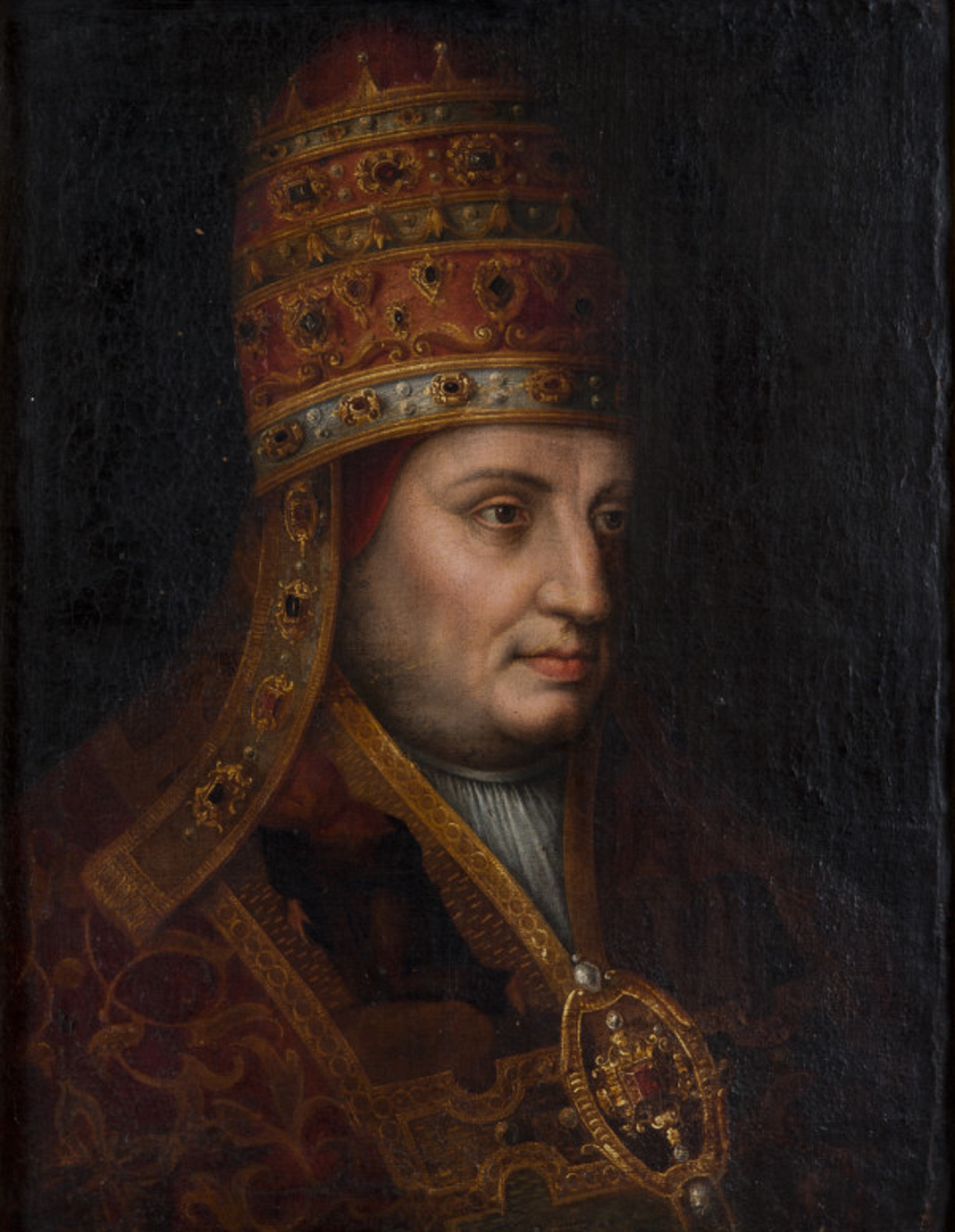
18th century portrait of Antipope Felix V

Felix V is credited with formalising the academic lectures held in Basel by establishing the "Alma universitas studii curiae Romanae" on 12 November 1440; it was inaugurated at a ceremony held on 5 November 1440. It would eventually lead to the foundation of the University of Basel in 1460, by Pope Pius II (Piccolomini) in the bull "Inter Ceteras" of 12 November 1459.

He departed Basel for Lausanne, on the grounds of ill health, on 19 November 1442, thereby diminishing the importance of the Council of Basel.

Bishop François de Mez of Geneva died on 7 March 1444, and on 9 March the chamberlain of Anti-pope Felix V, Jean de Grolée, took possession of the diocese in the name of the antipope as administrator. On the same day, the antipope's son, Duke Louis of Savoy, ordered the episcopal chateau of Thie to be put under the control of the cathedral Chapter of Geneva. The death of the cardinal had been foreseen and was provided for. In 1446, Felix V named Bishop Bartholomew of Corneto as his Vicar in spiritualities and temporalities for the Diocese of Geneva; in 1449, he was succeeded by Bishop Andrea of Hebron. Cardinal Amadeus, as he had become in 1449, held the office of administrator until his death.

On 20 July 1447, the Frederick III, then King of the Romans ordered the Burgomeister of Basel to cancel the safe conducts which had previously been granted to the persons attending the Council of Basel, and to no longer allow the members of the council to remain in Basel. This was reinforced by an order in council of 24 May 1448, requiring the citizens of Basel, who had previously been reluctant, to expel them. The Council therefore moved its sessions to the city of Lausanne, where they held their first meeting on 25 July 1448, presided over by Anti-Pope Felix V.

His reputation is marred by the account of him as a pontiff concerned with money, to avoid disadvantaging his heirs, found in the Commentaries of Pius II.

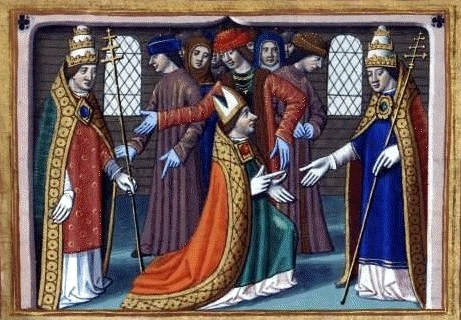
Félix V accepting the authority of Nicholas V, Martial d'Auvergne, illumination from the Vigilles de Charles VII (15th century)

After the death of his opponent Pope Eugene IV in 1447, both obediences in the schism of the church favoured a settlement. On 7 April 1449, at the second session of the Council of Lausanne, Felix V accepted the authority of Pope Nicholas V and resigned his papacy. In its fourth session, on 19 April 1449, since the throne of Peter was vacant, the Council of Lausanne elected Nicholas V as its pope. In its fifth and last session, it recognised Amadeus VIII of Savoy to be Bishop of Sabina and papal legate in Savoy, and assigned him second rank in the Church after Pope Nicholas. It then adjourned permanently.

== Later life ==
After the renunciation of his papal office, Amadeus was named a cardinal by Pope Nicholas V on 7 April 1449. On 23 April 1449, he was appointed suburbicarian Bishop of Sabina, and papal legate and Vicar Apostolic in all of the territories in the domain of the Duke of Savoy, and in the diocese of Lausanne. His complete itinerary, from 15 April 1449 to 6 January 1451, is given by Édouard Mallet, based on Cardinal Amadeus' registers.

Amadeus died in Geneva on 7 January 1451, and was buried at Ripaille on 9 January. Pope Nicholas V wrote an apostolic brief, dated 30 April 1451, in appreciation of the life and career of Cardinal Amadeus.

== Marriage and issue ==
Count Amadeus married Mary of Burgundy (1386–1428), daughter of Philip the Bold, Duke of Burgundy, at Arras in 1401. However, she did not arrive in Savoy until 1403. They had nine children, of whom only four survived to adulthood:

1. Margaret of Savoy (13 May 1405 – 1418).
2. Anthony of Savoy (September 1407 – before 12 December 1407).
3. Anthony of Savoy (1408 – after 10 October 1408).
4. Marie of Savoy (end of January 1411 – 22 February 1469), married Filippo Maria Visconti, Duke of Milan.
5. Amadeus of Savoy (26 March 1412 – 17 August 1431), Prince of Piedmont, heir apparent until his premature death.
6. Louis (24 February 1413 – 29 January 1465), succeeded his father as Duke of Savoy in 1440.
7. Bonne of Savoy (September 1415 – 25 September 1430).
8. Philip of Savoy (1417 – 3 March 1444), Count of Genève.
9. Margaret of Savoy (7 August 1420 – 30 September 1479), married firstly Louis III, Duke of Anjou and titular King of Naples; secondly Louis IV, Count Palatine of the Rhine; and thirdly Ulrich V, Count of Württemberg.

== Sources ==
- Andenmatten, B.; Paravicini Bagliani, A. (ed.) (1992). Amédée VIII-Félix V, premier duc de Savoie et pape (1383–1451). Colloque international, Ripaille-Lausanne, 23–26 octobre 1990. Lausanne 1992. (in French)
- Bruchet, M. (1907). Le château de Ripaille. (in French). Paris: Ch. Delagrave 1907. See: pp. 49–182.
- Cognasso, Francesco (1930). Amadeo VIII (1383–1451). 2 vols. Turin, 1930. (in Italian)
- Decaluwe, Michiel; Izbicki, Thomas M.; Christianson, Gerald, eds. (2017). A Companion to the Council of Basel. Brill.
- Creighton, Mandell (1892). The Council of Basel. Longmans, Green, and Company.
- Guichenon, Samuel (1660). Histoire Généalogique De La Royale Maison De Savoye: Iustifiée Par Titres, Fondations de Monasteres, Manuscripts, anciens Monuments, Histoires & autres preuves autentiques. Enrichie De Plusieurs Portraits, Seaux, Monnoyes, Sepultures & Armoires. Livre VI, Contenant Les Preuves. (in French and Latin). Lyon: Barbier, 1660.
- Hand, Joni M. (2016). Women, Manuscripts and Identity in Northern Europe, 1350–1550. Routledge. appendix 4
- Hildesheimer, E. (1970). "Le Pape du Concile, Amédée VIII de Savoie", Annales de la Société des Lettres, Sciences et Arts des Alpes-Maritime, 61 (1969–1970), pp. 41–48. (in French)
- Kirsch, Johann Peter (1909). "Felix V". The Catholic Encyclopedia. Vol. 6. New York: Robert Appleton Company.
- Mallet, Édouard (1847). "Mémoire historique sur l'élection des évêques de Genève. Second partie", (in French), in: Mémoires et documents de la Société d'histoire et d'archéologie, Volume 5 (Genève: La Société/F. Ramboz, 1847), pp. 127–354.
- Manger, Hugo (1901). Die Wahl Amadeo's von Savoyen zum Papste durch das Basler Konzil (1439). (in German). Marburg: R. Friedrich, 1901.
- Stieber, Joachim W. (1978). Pope Eugene IV, the council of Basel, and the secular and ecclesiastical authorities in the Empire: the conflict over supreme authority and power in the Church. Leiden: Brill 1978.

=== For further reading ===
- Kekewich, Margaret L. (2008). The Good King: René of Anjou and Fifteenth Century Europe. Palgrave Macmillan.
- Pinder, Kymberly N., ed. (2002). Race-ing Art History: Critical Readings in Race and Art History. Routledge.
- Vaughan, Richard (2005). Philip the Bold: The Formation of the Burgundian State. Boydell Press.
- Wilkins, David G.; Wilkins, Rebecca L. (1996). The Search for a Patron in the Middle Ages and the Renaissance. E. Mellen Press.

Amadeus VIII the Peaceful House of Savoy Born: 4 September 1383 Died: 7 January 1451
Regnal titles
New creation County elevated to Duchy	Duke of Savoy; 1416–1440	Succeeded by Louis
Preceded by Amadeus VII	Count of Savoy; 1391–1416	County elevated to Duchy
