= Canton of Ryes =

Coordinates: 49°18′54″N 0°36′11″W

The canton of Ryes is a former canton of the Calvados département in northwestern France. It had 12,033 inhabitants (2012). It was disbanded following the French canton reorganisation which came into effect in March 2015.

The canton comprised 25 communes: Arromanches-les-Bains, Asnelles, Banville, Bazenville, Colombiers sur Seulles, Commes, Crépon, Esquay-sur-Seulles, Graye sur Mer, Longues-sur-Mer, Magny-en-Bessin, Le Manoir, Manvieux, Meuvaines, Port-en-Bessin-Huppain, Ryes, Saint-Côme-de-Fresné, Sainte-Croix-sur-Mer, Sommervieu, Tierceville, Tracy-sur-Mer, Vaux-sur-Aure, Ver-sur-Mer, Vienne-en-Bessin et Villiers-le-Sec.
