= Arganchy =

Commune in Normandy, France

- Commune
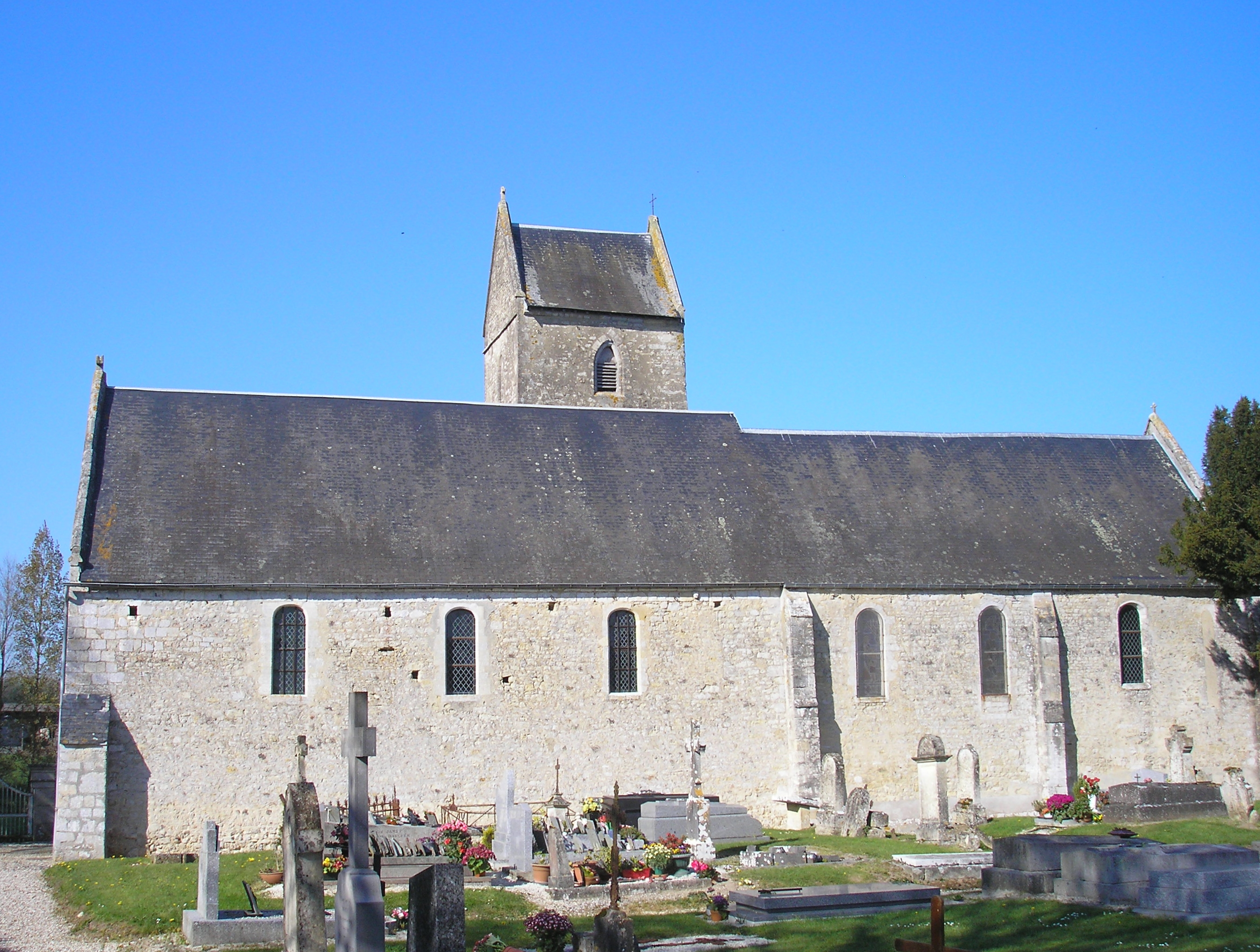
- The Church of Sainte-Radegonde
- Location of Arganchy
- Location within France Location within Normandy
- Coordinates: 49°14′12″N 0°44′26″W
- Country: France
- Region: Normandy
- Department: Calvados
- Arrondissement: Bayeux
- Canton: Bayeux
- Intercommunality: Bayeux Intercom

Government
  - Mayor (2020–2026): Daniel Avoine
- Area^{1}: 7.07 km^{2} (2.73 sq mi)
- Elevation: 40 m (130 ft)
- Highest elevation: 81 m (266 ft)
- Lowest elevation: 33 m (108 ft)
- Population (2023): 220
  - Density: 31/km^{2} (81/sq mi)
- Time zone: UTC+01:00 (CET)
  - Summer (DST): UTC+02:00 (CEST)
- INSEE/Postal code: 14019 /14400
- ^{1} French Land Register data, which excludes lakes, ponds, glaciers > 1 km^{2} (0.386 sq mi or 247 acres) and river estuaries.

Arganchy (French pronunciation: [aʁɡɑ̃ʃi]) is a commune in the Calvados department in the Normandy region of northwestern France.

== Geography ==
Arganchy is located in the area of Bessin in the valley of the Gourguichon Stream some 6.5 km south-west of Bayeux and 7 km north-east of Castillon. Access to the commune is by the D192 road from Subles in the west passing through the commune north of the village and continuing east to join National Highway N13 east of Monceaux-en-Bessin. The village is reached by the country road L'Eglise running off the D192. The D572 highway runs through the north-western corner of the commune with an exit onto the D192 at Subles. Apart from the village there are also the hamlets of La Mauvielle, Saint-Amator, La Petite Flague, and Les Feffes in the commune. The commune is entirely farmland.

The Cayennes Stream flows from the south to join the Gourgichon Stream east of the village which flows west to join the Drôme at Aprigny (Agy).

== Toponymy ==
The name Arganchy appears as Archenceium in 1198.

The origin of the name is attributed to the anthroponym Argentius: Latin according to René Lepelley or Gaulish according to Albert Dauzat and Charles Rostaing.

== History ==
In 1829 Arganchy (with 285 inhabitants in 1821) absorbed Saint-Amator (with 52 inhabitants) east of its territory.

== Administration ==
List of Successive Mayors

From	To	Name	Party
	2001	Geneviève Michel	
2001	2008	Claudine Dalmassie	
2008	2026	Daniel Avoine	ind.

The council is composed of eleven members including the mayor and two deputy mayors.

== Population ==
The inhabitants of the commune are known as Arganchois or Arganchoises in French.

Historical population
Year	Pop.	±% p.a.
1968	201	—
1975	135	−5.53%
1982	170	+3.35%
1990	218	+3.16%
1999	230	+0.60%
2007	225	−0.27%
2012	236	+0.96%
2017	227	−0.77%
2023	220	−0.52%
Source: INSEE

== Economy ==
At a place called La Grande Abbaye there is a natural camping ground.

== Sites and Monuments ==
- The Parish church of Saint-Radegonde dates from the 17th century. It contains three items which are registered as historical objects:
  - A Tabernacle (18th century)
  - A Retable (1670-1680)
  - An Altar, Tabernacle, and Retable (18th century)
- A Lavoir (Public laundry): a concert venue (for the choir).
- La Forte Main, north of Saint-Amator, where counterfeit coins were once made.

== See also ==
- Communes of the Calvados department
