= Barbeville =

- Commune
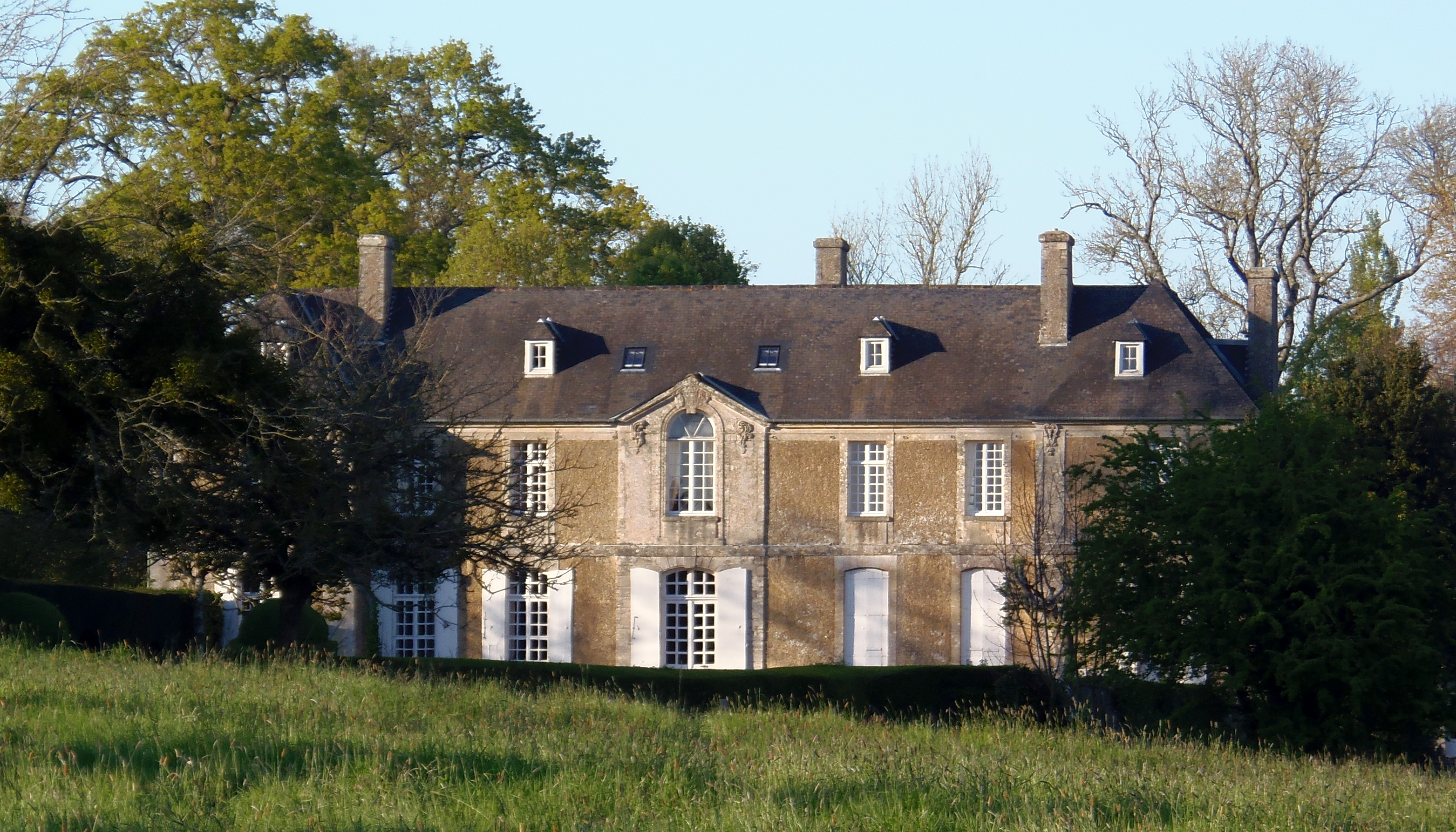
- Barbeville Chateau
- Location of Barbeville
- Location within France Location within Normandy
- Coordinates: 49°16′32″N 0°44′52″W
- Country: France
- Region: Normandy
- Department: Calvados
- Arrondissement: Bayeux
- Canton: Bayeux
- Intercommunality: CC Bayeux Intercom

Government
  - Mayor (2020–2026): Christian Viel
- Area^{1}: 3.47 km^{2} (1.34 sq mi)
- Elevation: 53 m (174 ft)
- Highest elevation: 62 m (203 ft)
- Lowest elevation: 22 m (72 ft)
- Population (2023): 240
  - Density: 69/km^{2} (180/sq mi)
- Time zone: UTC+01:00 (CET)
  - Summer (DST): UTC+02:00 (CEST)
- INSEE/Postal code: 14040 /14400
- ^{1} French Land Register data, which excludes lakes, ponds, glaciers > 1 km^{2} (0.386 sq mi or 247 acres) and river estuaries.

Barbeville (French pronunciation: [baʁbəvil]) is a commune in the Calvados department in the Normandy region of north-western France.

== Geography ==
Barbeville is located in the Drône valley some 4 km west of Bayeux. Access to the commune is by the D96 road from Bayeux which passes through the heart of the commune and the village and continues west to Rubercy. The D5 from Bayeux to Le Molay-Littry forms the southern border of the commune. The D169 from Vaucelles in the north passes south down the eastern side of the commune and continues to Ranchy. The Route nationale N13 passes through the eastern arm of the commune with the nearest exit being Exit 38 just north of the commune. The commune is entirely farmland.

The Drôme river forms the entire eastern border of the commune as it flows north to join the Aure south-west of Commes. The Ruisseau de Cottun flows from the west of the commune to join the Drome on the eastern border. The Ruisseau de Saint-Symphorien flows along the northern border towards the east, forming parts of the border and joining the Drome at the north-eastern tip of the commune.

== History ==
Barbeville appears as Barbeville on the 1750 Cassini Map but unusually does not appear on the 1790 version.

== Administration ==
List of Successive Mayors

From	To	Name	Party	Position
1968	1989	Philippe Henry		Horse Breeder
1989	2001	Hervé Legrand		
2001	2008	Henri Kliszowski		Retired Surgeon
2008	2020	Denis Énée		Retired Banker
2020	2026	Christian Viel		Retired Banker

== Demography ==
The inhabitants of the commune are known as Barbevillais or Barbevillaises in French.

Historical population

Year	Pop.	±% p.a.
1793	254	—
1821	223	−0.46%
1846	190	−0.64%
1872	172	−0.38%
1901	224	+0.92%
1926	202	−0.41%
1946	197	−0.13%
1962	169	−0.95%
1968	196	+2.50%

Year	Pop.	±% p.a.
1975	181	−1.13%
1982	174	−0.56%
1990	151	−1.76%
1999	163	+0.85%
2007	182	+1.39%
2012	187	+0.54%
2017	178	−0.98%
2023	240	+5.11%

Source: EHESS and INSEE

== Sites and monuments ==
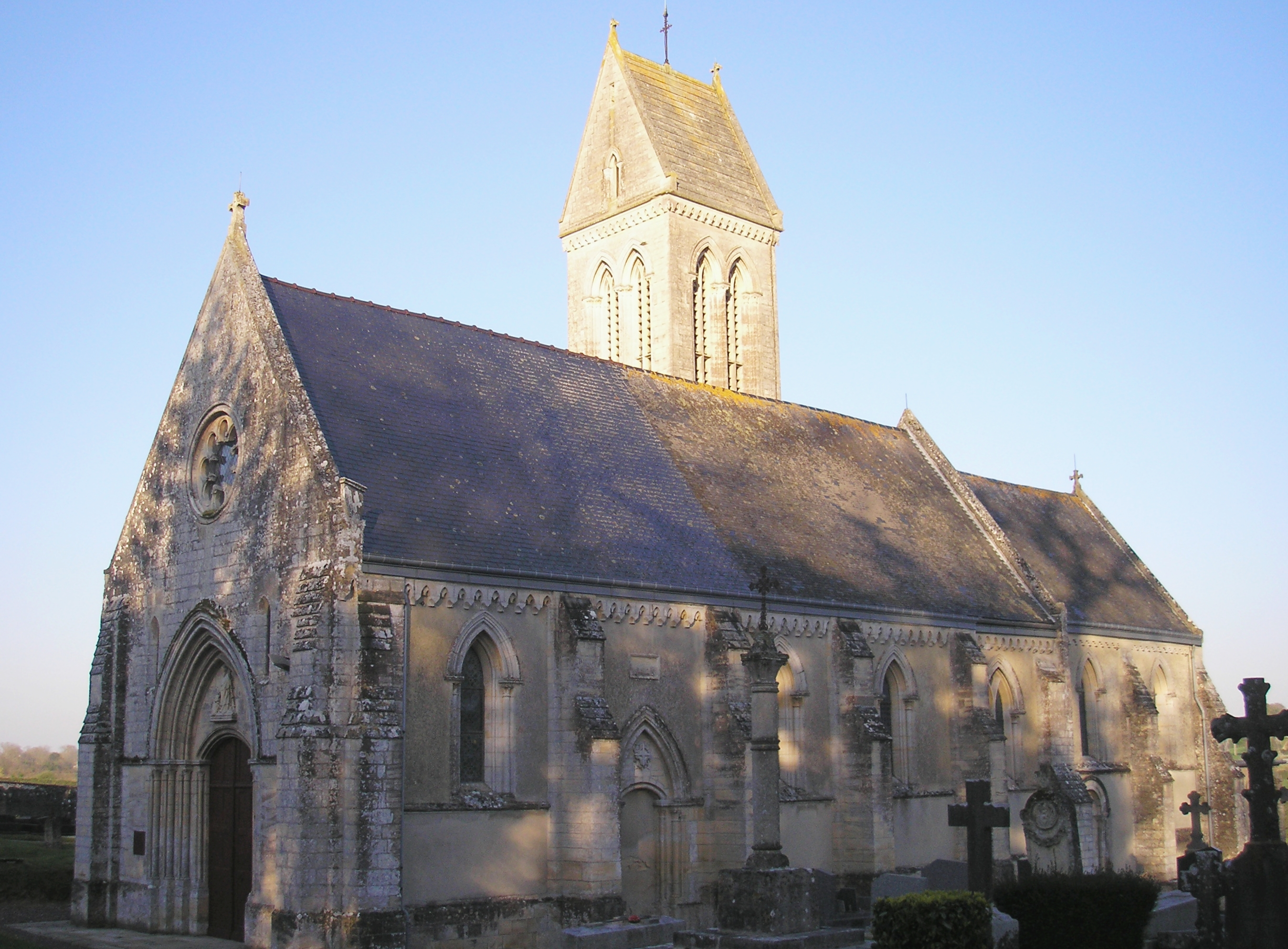
The Church of Saint-Martin

The commune has two structures which are registered as historical monuments:

- A Chateau (18th century)
- The Church of Saint-Martin (13th century) The Church contains an Organ (19th century) that is registered as an historical object.

Other sites of interest

- The Barbeville Stud was created at the end of the 19th century by Count Foy. It is a centre for the breeding of yearlings. The Barbeville prize was contested in a race for the first time at Longchamp in 1889 and it still exists.
- The Chateau of Monts (19th century)
- The Cambray Manor was built by Népomucène Lemercier at the end of the 18th century.

== Notable people linked to the commune ==
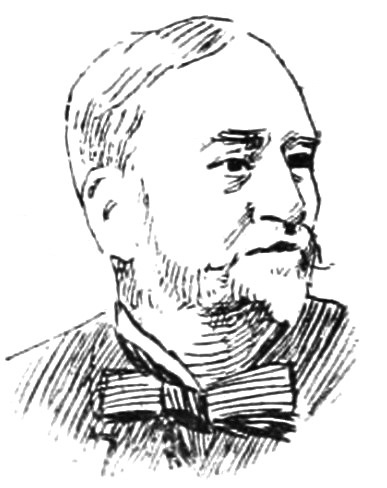
Henri Gérard

- Henri Gérard (1818-1903), MP for Calvados from 1881 to 1902, was mayor of Barbeville.

== See also ==
- Communes of the Calvados department
