= Vaux-sur-Seulles =

- Commune
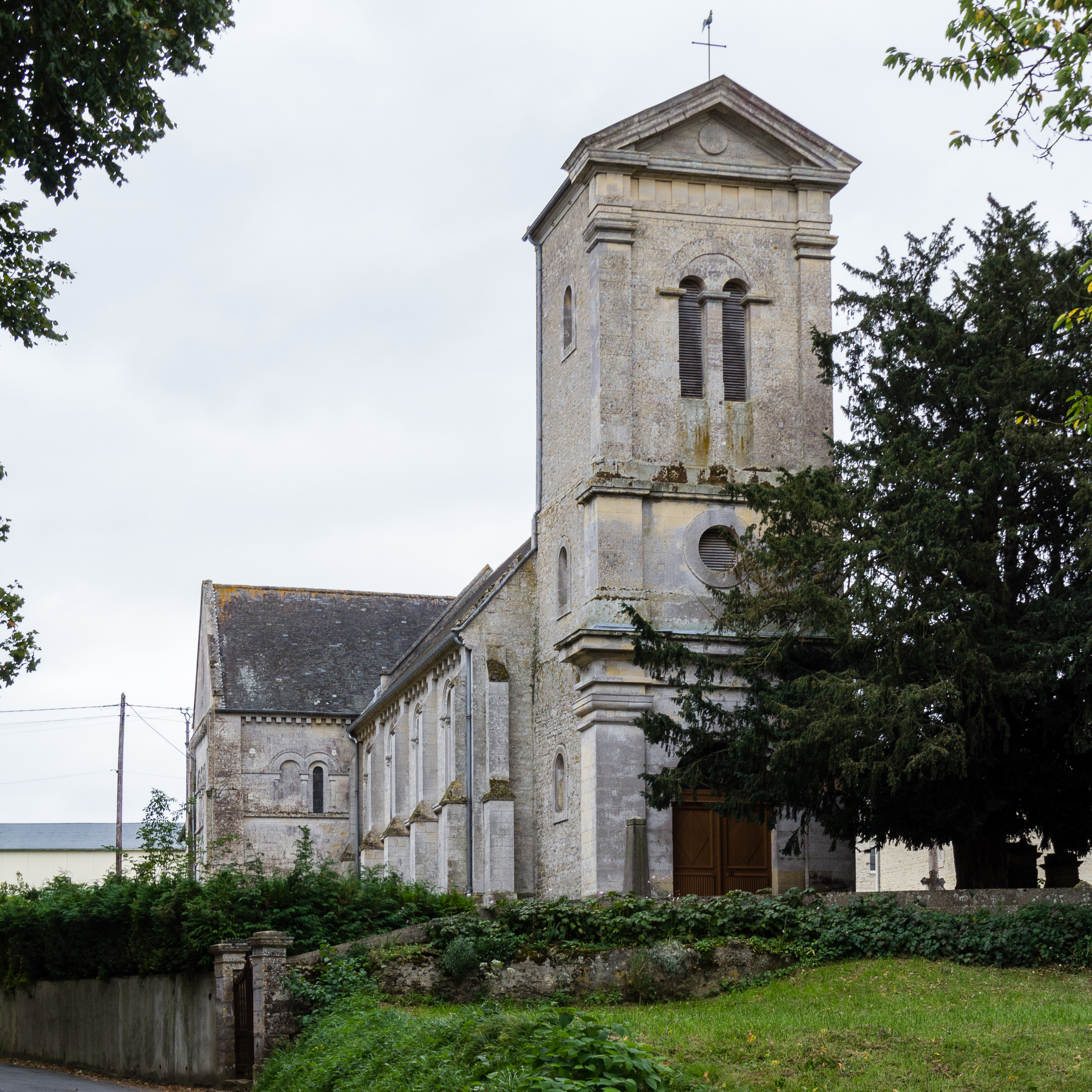
- The church in Vaux-sur-Seulles
- Location of Vaux-sur-Seulles
- Location within France Location within Normandy
- Coordinates: 49°15′40″N 0°37′39″W
- Country: France
- Region: Normandy
- Department: Calvados
- Arrondissement: Bayeux
- Canton: Bayeux
- Intercommunality: CC Bayeux Intercom

Government
  - Mayor (2020–2026): Sylvie Boust
- Area^{1}: 6.56 km^{2} (2.53 sq mi)
- Elevation: 56 m (184 ft)
- Highest elevation: 72 m (236 ft)
- Lowest elevation: 22 m (72 ft)
- Population (2023): 327
  - Density: 49.8/km^{2} (129/sq mi)
- Time zone: UTC+01:00 (CET)
  - Summer (DST): UTC+02:00 (CEST)
- INSEE/Postal code: 14733 /14400
- ^{1} French Land Register data, which excludes lakes, ponds, glaciers > 1 km^{2} (0.386 sq mi or 247 acres) and river estuaries.

Vaux-sur-Seulles (French pronunciation: [vo syʁ sœl]) is a commune in the Calvados department in the Normandy region in northwestern France.

== Geography ==
Vaux-sur-Seulles is located 6 kilometers from Bayeux, in the Bessin region. The town is crossed by the Seulles river.

== Demographics ==
Historical population

Year	Pop.	±% p.a.
1793	389	—
1821	405	+0.14%
1846	451	+0.43%
1872	443	−0.07%
1901	286	−1.50%
1926	253	−0.49%
1946	281	+0.53%
1962	281	+0.00%
1968	230	−3.28%

Year	Pop.	±% p.a.
1975	248	+1.08%
1982	286	+2.06%
1990	332	+1.88%
1999	322	−0.34%
2007	303	−0.76%
2012	290	−0.87%
2017	305	+1.01%
2023	327	+1.17%

Source: EHESS and INSEE (1968-2023)

== See also ==
- Communes of the Calvados department
