= Agy =

- Commune
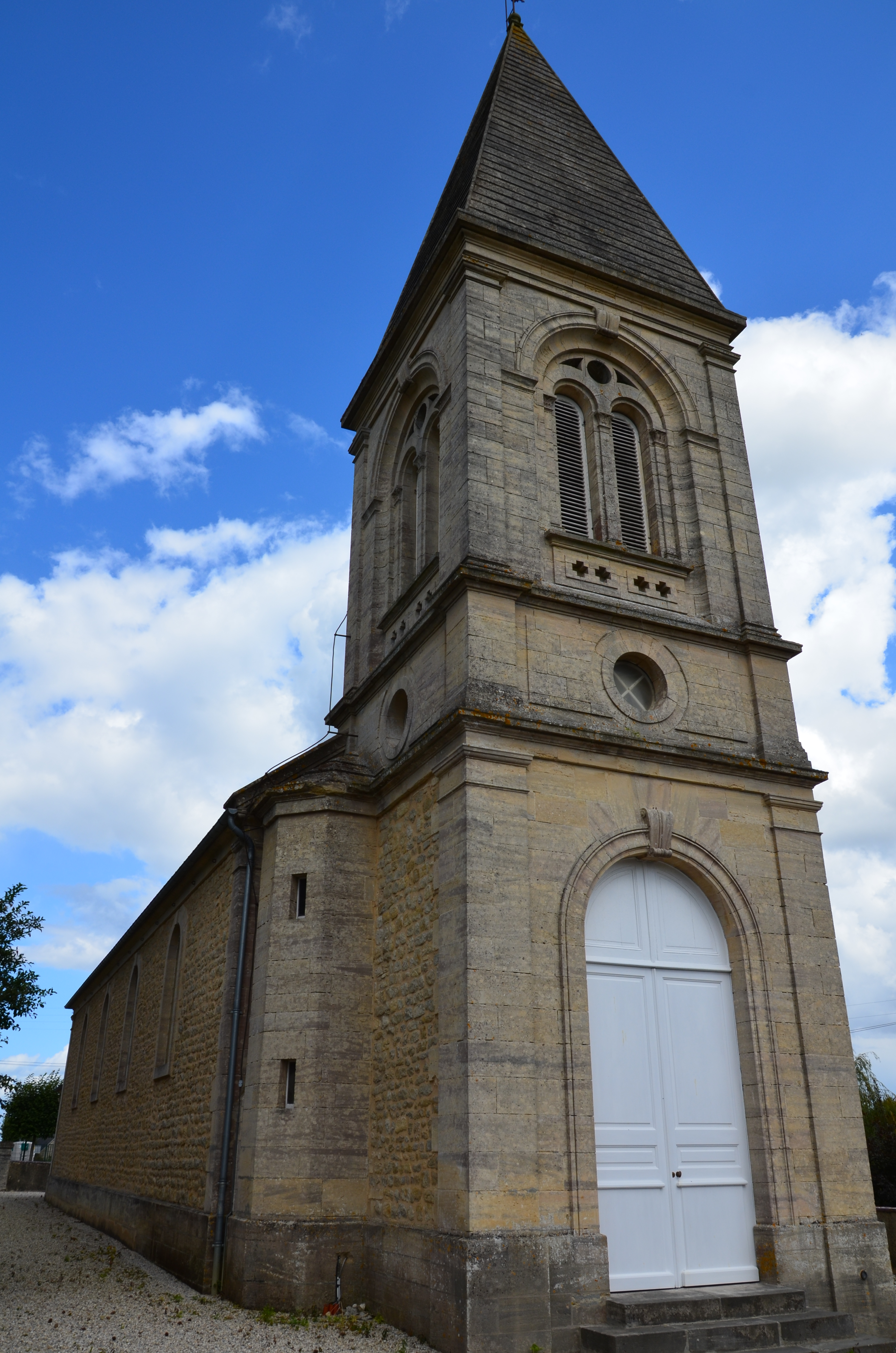
- The Church of Saint Vigor
- Location of Agy
- Location within France Location within Normandy
- Coordinates: 49°14′30″N 0°45′36″W
- Country: France
- Region: Normandy
- Department: Calvados
- Arrondissement: Bayeux
- Canton: Bayeux
- Intercommunality: Bayeux Intercom

Government
  - Mayor (2020–2026): Christophe Poitevin
- Area^{1}: 4.21 km^{2} (1.63 sq mi)
- Elevation: 65 m (213 ft)
- Highest elevation: 83 m (272 ft)
- Lowest elevation: 30 m (98 ft)
- Population (2023): 320
  - Density: 76/km^{2} (200/sq mi)
- Time zone: UTC+01:00 (CET)
  - Summer (DST): UTC+02:00 (CEST)
- INSEE/Postal code: 14003 /14400
- ^{1} French Land Register data, which excludes lakes, ponds, glaciers > 1 km^{2} (0.386 sq mi or 247 acres) and river estuaries.

Agy (French pronunciation: [aʒi]) is a commune in the Calvados department in the Normandy region of north-western France.

== Geography ==
Agy is located 4 km south-west of Bayeux and 7 km north-east of Balleroy. The D572 highway from Bayeux to Saint-Lô passes through the eastern edges of the commune. The rest of the commune can be reached on the D207 from Campigny in the north-west passing through the village then continuing south-east to join the D572A which is parallel to the D572. Apart from the village there are three hamlets: La Commune, Les Malcadets, and Aprigny all along the D207 road. The rest of the commune is entirely farmland.

The north-east border of the commune is marked by the Drone river with the southern border marked by the Ponche. In the west is the Vicalet stream flowing north and partly forming the western border.

== Toponymy ==
The town's name is attested in its Latin form Ageyum as early as the 9th century. It seems to be based on the Latin surname Agius, followed by the Gaulish suffix -acum. If this theory is correct it follows that Agy was once the lands of a man called Agius.

== History ==
In 1834 the parish of Agy was attached to Subles and the Agy church was put on sale for demolition. On 25 August 1834, however, residents opposed the bailiffs who came to take possession of the premises with the buyers. Faced with resistance, Alexandre Douesnel-Dubosq - public prosecutor, was summoned by the police but, armed with clubs, the population continued to oppose the destruction of the church and the cemetery. In the afternoon the National Guard of Bayeux arrived to reinforce the police with three hundred men and this ended the riot. Three protesters were sentenced by the Correctional Tribunal of Bayeux. The demolition of the church took place over the following days. The people of Subles celebrated this event which created rivalry between the two towns. A resident of Subles set up the cock from the steeple of the Agy church on his house. The people of Agy then joined the French Catholic Church of Father Châtel and launched a subscription that led to the construction of a new church and the installation of a priest who was a disciple of Father Chatel. In this way, the people had their revenge.

== Administration ==
List of Successive Mayors of Agy

From	To	Name	Party	Position
-	2001	Francis Blondel		
2001	2014	Claude Tillard	ind.	Professor of Mechanical Engineering
2014	2020	Yvette Jeanne	ind.	Retired manager
2020	2026	Christophe Poitevin		

== Population ==
Historical population

Year	Pop.	±% p.a.
1793	302	—
1821	306	+0.05%
1846	314	+0.10%
1872	264	−0.66%
1901	230	−0.47%
1926	160	−1.44%
1946	198	+1.07%
1962	162	−1.25%
1968	183	+2.05%

Year	Pop.	±% p.a.
1975	135	−4.25%
1982	267	+10.23%
1990	280	+0.60%
1999	280	+0.00%
2007	245	−1.66%
2012	234	−0.91%
2017	292	+4.53%
2023	320	+1.54%

Source: EHESS and INSEE

== Sites and monuments ==
- A Castle from the 18th century and a stately mansion from the 16th century has belonged to the same family since 1805 and has been transmitted for several generations of women (Dragon de Gomiécourt / Isoard de Chénerilles / the Poëze of Harambure. A tribute to this family is on the windows of the church of the commune
- The Church of Saint-Vigor, built in the 19th century.
- The Villa of Agy (19th century). Balzac, during his stay in Bayeux, visited the owner, Mrs Hautefeuille who he described as "as full of spirit as the most spiritual Parisian woman".

== See also ==
- Communes of the Calvados department
