= Le Manoir =

Le Manoir is the name of two communes in France:

- Le Manoir, Calvados
- Le Manoir, Eure

It is also a shortened name for a hotel/restaurant:

- Le Manoir aux Quat' Saisons
