= Canton of Bayeux =

Coordinates: 49°15′49″N 0°43′33″W

Bayeux
- Canton
- Country: France
- Region: Normandy
- Department: Calvados
- No. of communes: {{{nbcomm}}}

Government
  - Representatives (2021–2028): Jean-Léonce Dupont; Mélanie Lepoultier
- Area: 193.33 km^{2} (74.65 sq mi)
- Population (2023): 29,136
  - Density: 150.71/km^{2} (390.33/sq mi)
- INSEE code: 14 02

The canton of Bayeux is an administrative division of the Calvados department, northwestern France. Its borders were modified at the French canton reorganisation which came into effect in March 2015. Its seat is in Bayeux.

== Composition ==
It consists of the following communes:

- Agy
- Arganchy
- Barbeville
- Bayeux
- Campigny
- Chouain
- Commes
- Condé-sur-Seulles
- Cottun
- Cussy
- Ellon
- Esquay-sur-Seulles
- Guéron
- Juaye-Mondaye
- Longues-sur-Mer
- Magny-en-Bessin
- Le Manoir
- Manvieux
- Monceaux-en-Bessin
- Nonant
- Port-en-Bessin-Huppain
- Ranchy
- Ryes
- Saint-Loup-Hors
- Saint-Martin-des-Entrées
- Saint-Vigor-le-Grand
- Sommervieu
- Subles
- Sully
- Tracy-sur-Mer
- Vaucelles
- Vaux-sur-Aure
- Vaux-sur-Seulles
- Vienne-en-Bessin

== Councillors ==
Election	Councillors	Party	Occupation
2015	Jean-Léonce Dupont	UDI	Member of the Senate of France; President of the General council of Calvados
2015	Mélanie Lepoultier	DVD	Mayor of Sommervieu
2021	Jean-Léonce Dupont	UDI	President of the General council of Calvados
2021	Mélanie Lepoultier	DVD	Mayor of Sommervieu

== Pictures of the canton ==
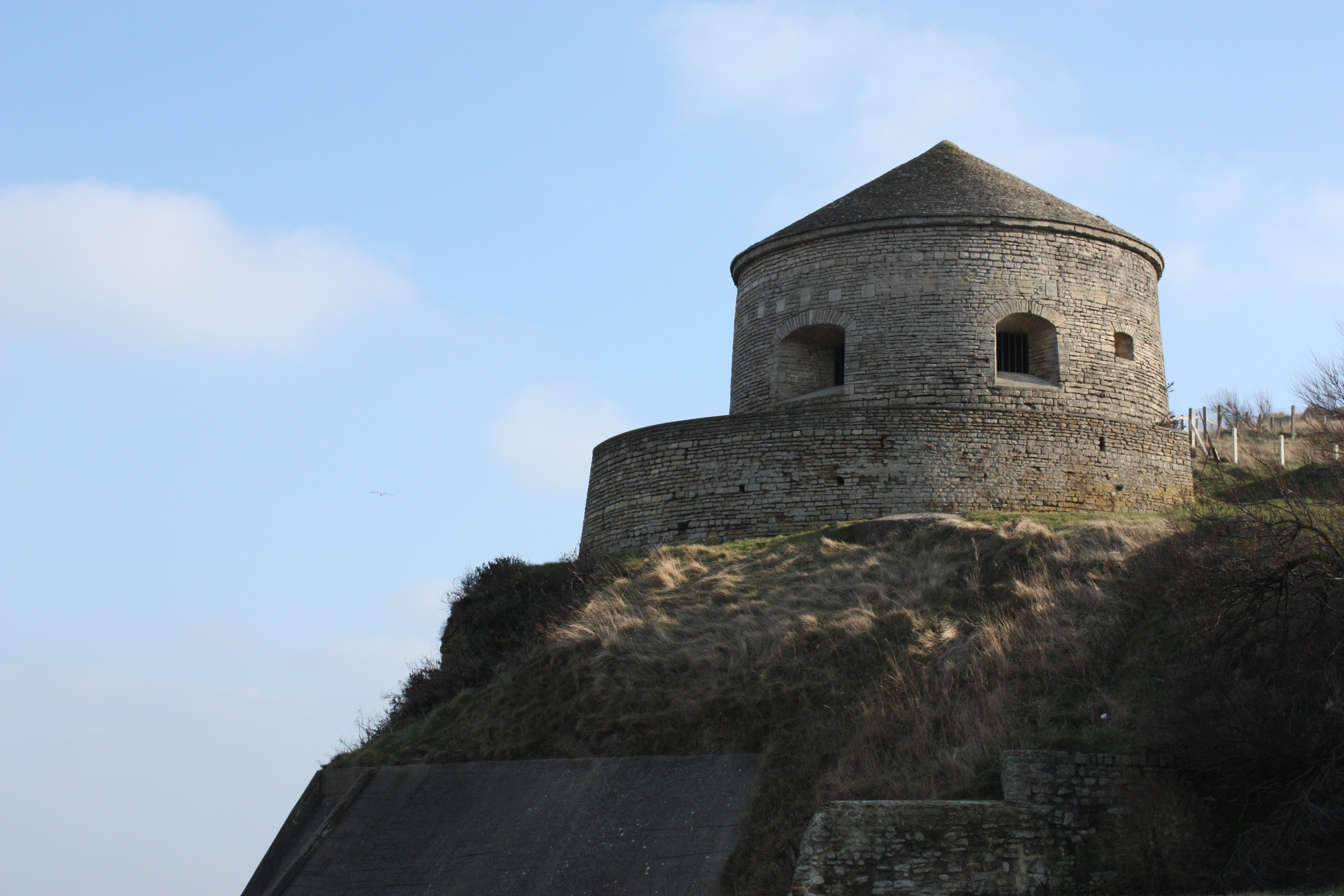
Vauban tower in Port-en-Bessin-Huppain

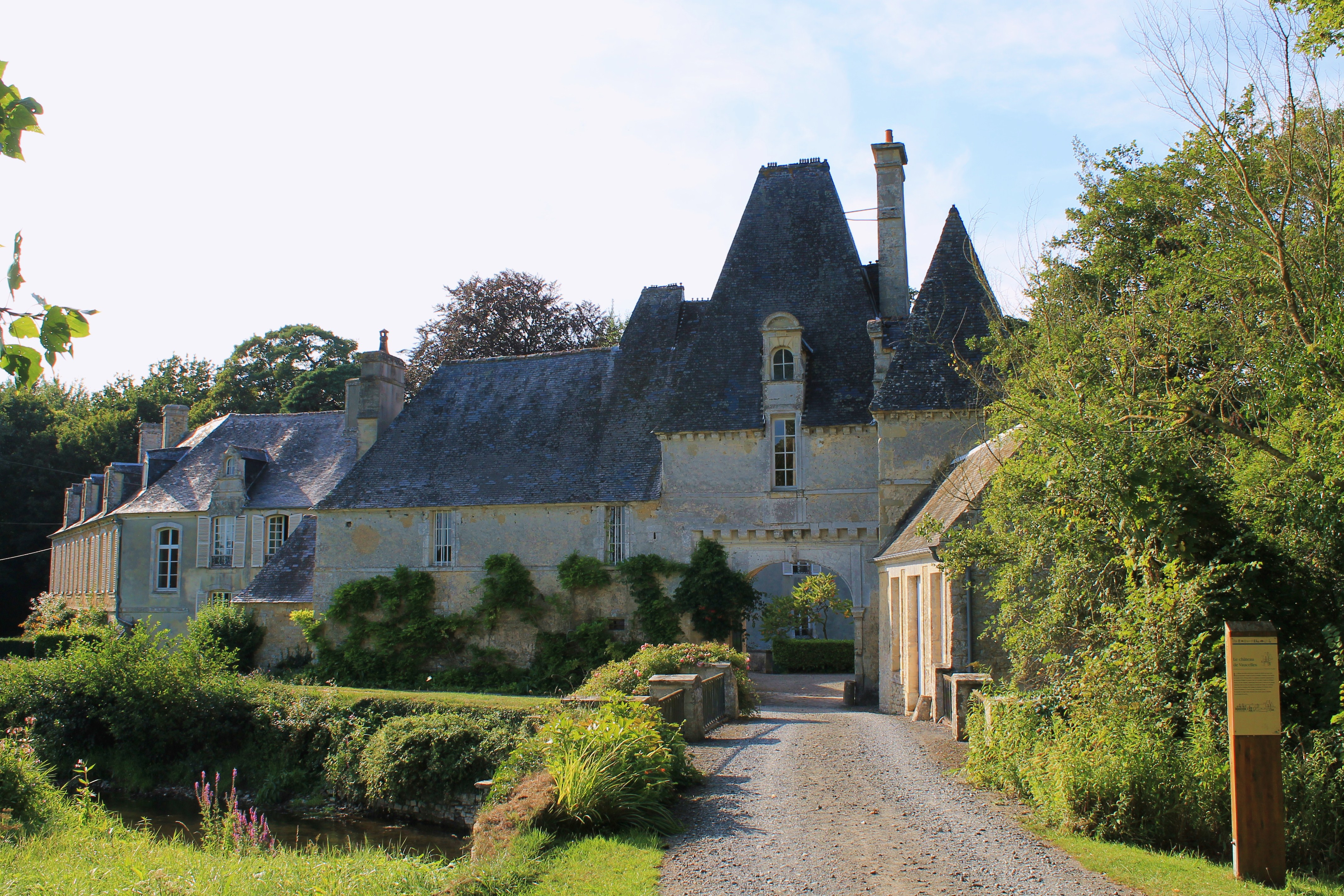
Castle in Vaucelles

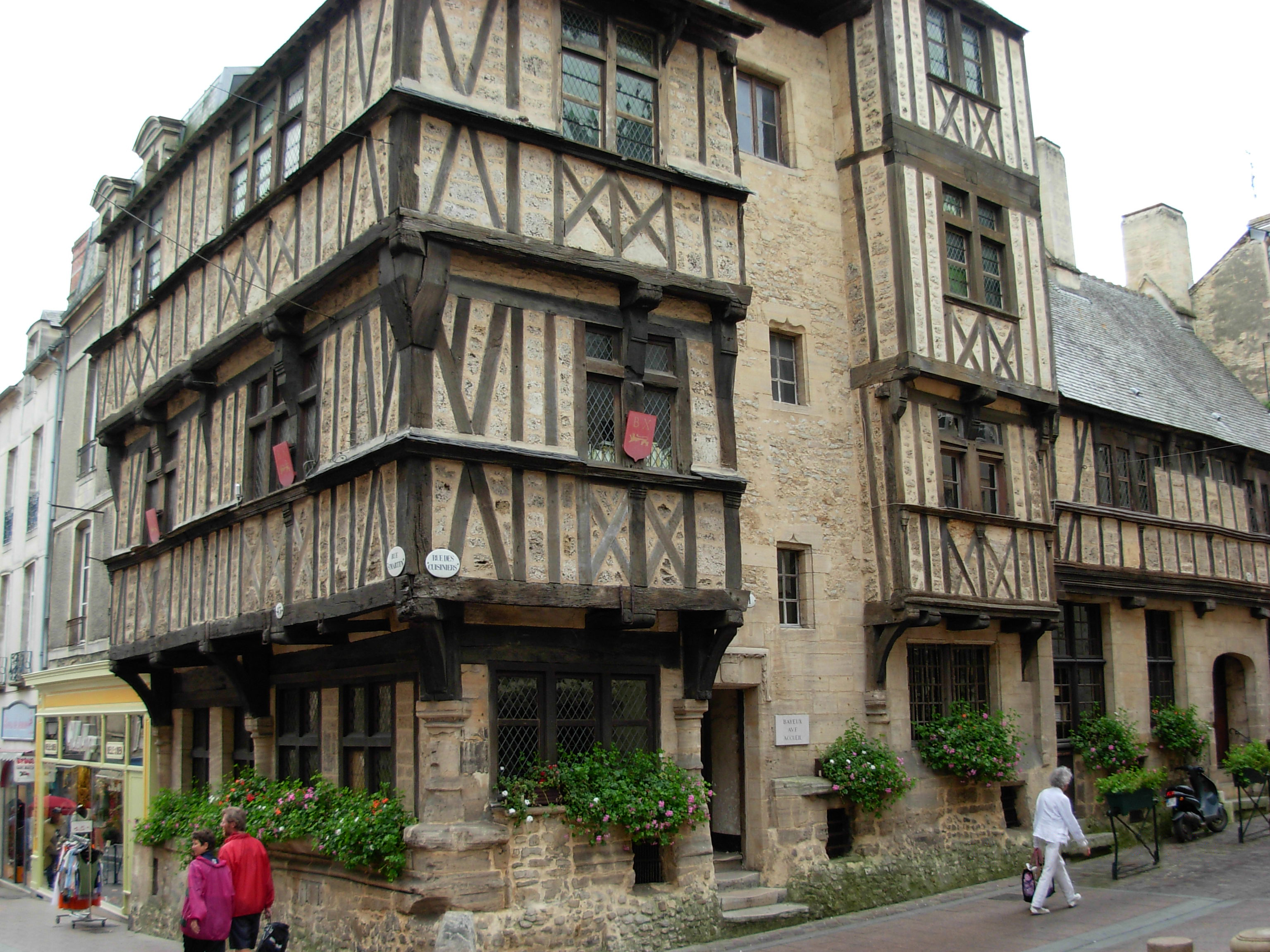
Medieval house in Bayeux
