= Monceaux-en-Bessin =

- Commune
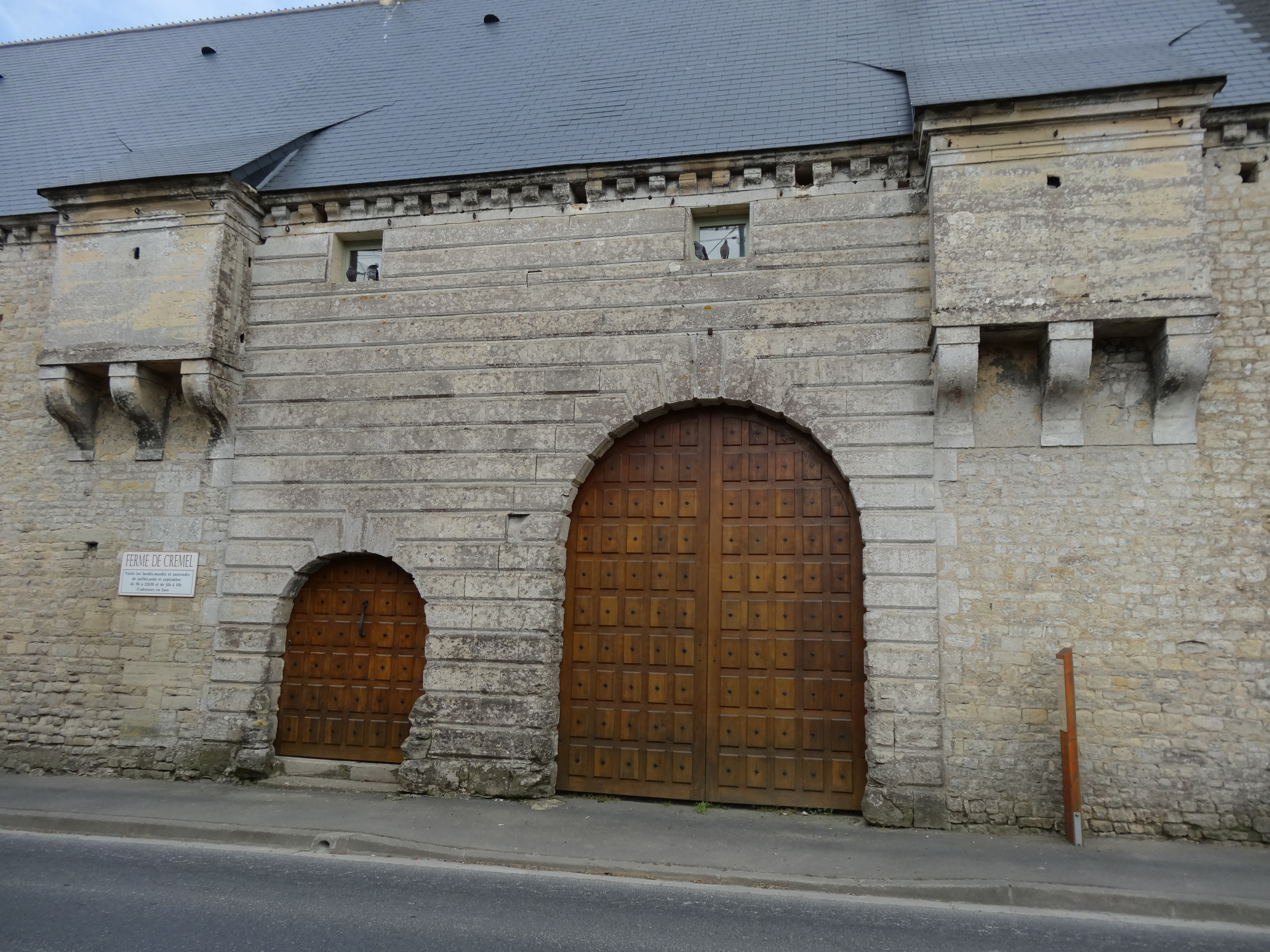
- The entrance to Crémel Manor
- Location of Monceaux-en-Bessin
- Location within France Location within Normandy
- Coordinates: 49°14′57″N 0°41′33″W
- Country: France
- Region: Normandy
- Department: Calvados
- Arrondissement: Bayeux
- Canton: Bayeux
- Intercommunality: CC Bayeux Intercom

Government
  - Mayor (2020–2026): Gilles Isabelle
- Area^{1}: 4.73 km^{2} (1.83 sq mi)
- Elevation: 70 m (230 ft)
- Highest elevation: 82 m (269 ft)
- Lowest elevation: 40 m (130 ft)
- Population (2023): 601
  - Density: 127/km^{2} (329/sq mi)
- Time zone: UTC+01:00 (CET)
  - Summer (DST): UTC+02:00 (CEST)
- INSEE/Postal code: 14436 /14400
- ^{1} French Land Register data, which excludes lakes, ponds, glaciers > 1 km^{2} (0.386 sq mi or 247 acres) and river estuaries.

Monceaux-en-Bessin (French pronunciation: [mɔ̃so ɑ̃ bɛsɛ̃], literally Monceaux in Bessin) is a commune in the Calvados department and Normandy region of north-western France.

== Population ==
Historical population
Year	Pop.	±% p.a.
1968	244	—
1975	278	+1.88%
1982	346	+3.18%
1990	395	+1.67%
1999	384	−0.31%
2007	396	+0.39%
2012	531	+6.04%
2017	563	+1.18%
2023	601	+1.09%
Source: INSEE

== See also ==
- Communes of the Calvados department
