= Guéron =

- Commune
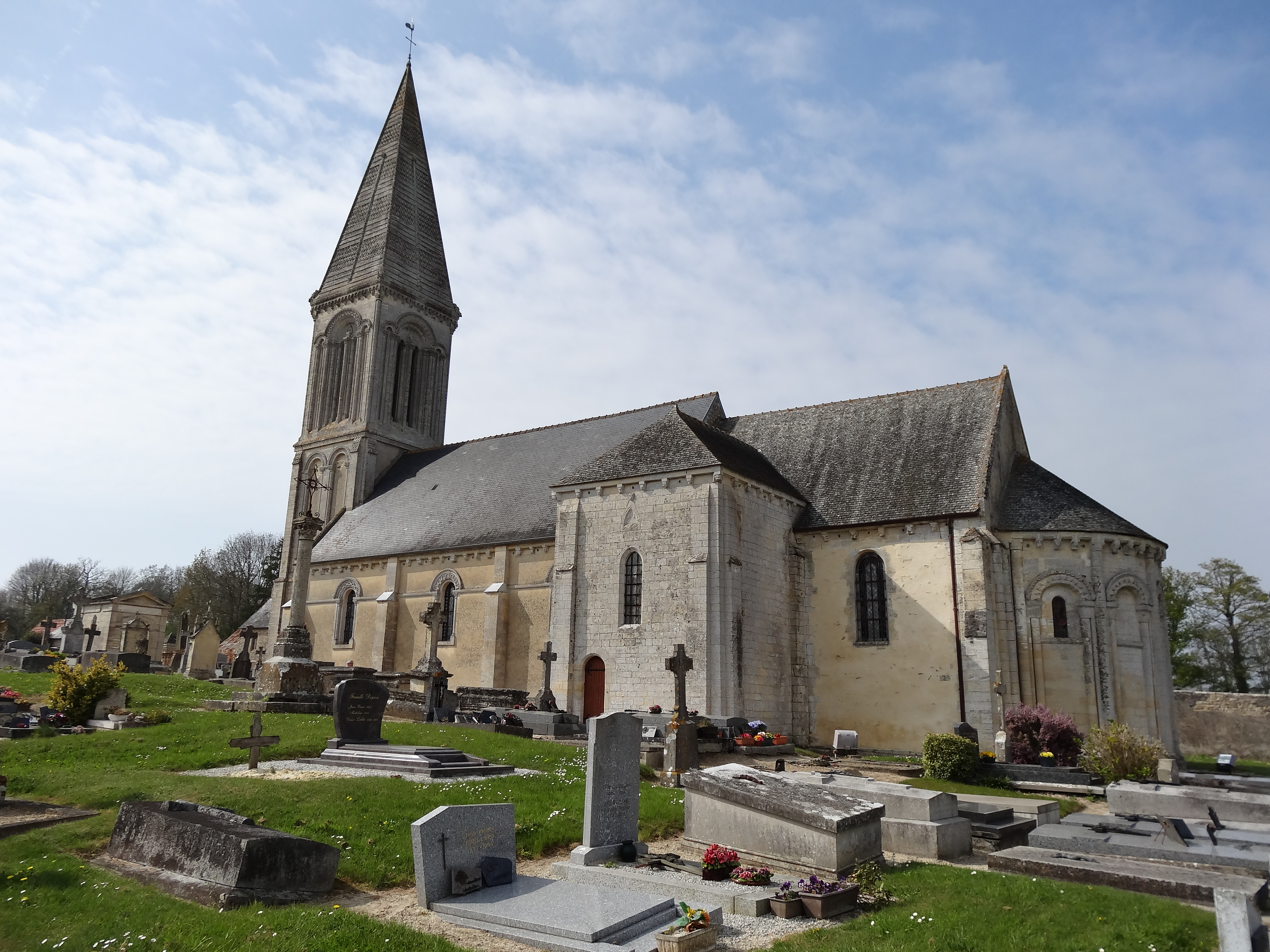
- The church in Guéron
- Location of Guéron
- Location within France Location within Normandy
- Coordinates: 49°15′00″N 0°42′41″W
- Country: France
- Region: Normandy
- Department: Calvados
- Arrondissement: Bayeux
- Canton: Bayeux
- Intercommunality: CC Bayeux Intercom

Government
  - Mayor (2020–2026): Marie-Claude Simonet
- Area^{1}: 5.27 km^{2} (2.03 sq mi)
- Elevation: 50 m (160 ft)
- Highest elevation: 84 m (276 ft)
- Lowest elevation: 38 m (125 ft)
- Population (2023): 247
  - Density: 46.9/km^{2} (121/sq mi)
- Time zone: UTC+01:00 (CET)
  - Summer (DST): UTC+02:00 (CEST)
- INSEE/Postal code: 14322 /14400
- ^{1} French Land Register data, which excludes lakes, ponds, glaciers > 1 km^{2} (0.386 sq mi or 247 acres) and river estuaries.

Guéron (French pronunciation: [ɡeʁɔ̃]) is a commune in the Calvados department in the Normandy region in northwestern France.

== Population ==
Historical population
Year	Pop.	±% p.a.
1968	224	—
1975	197	−1.82%
1982	238	+2.74%
1990	239	+0.05%
1999	236	−0.14%
2007	218	−0.99%
2012	245	+2.36%
2017	243	−0.16%
2023	247	+0.27%
Source: INSEE

== See also ==
- Communes of the Calvados department
