= Vienne-en-Bessin =

- Commune
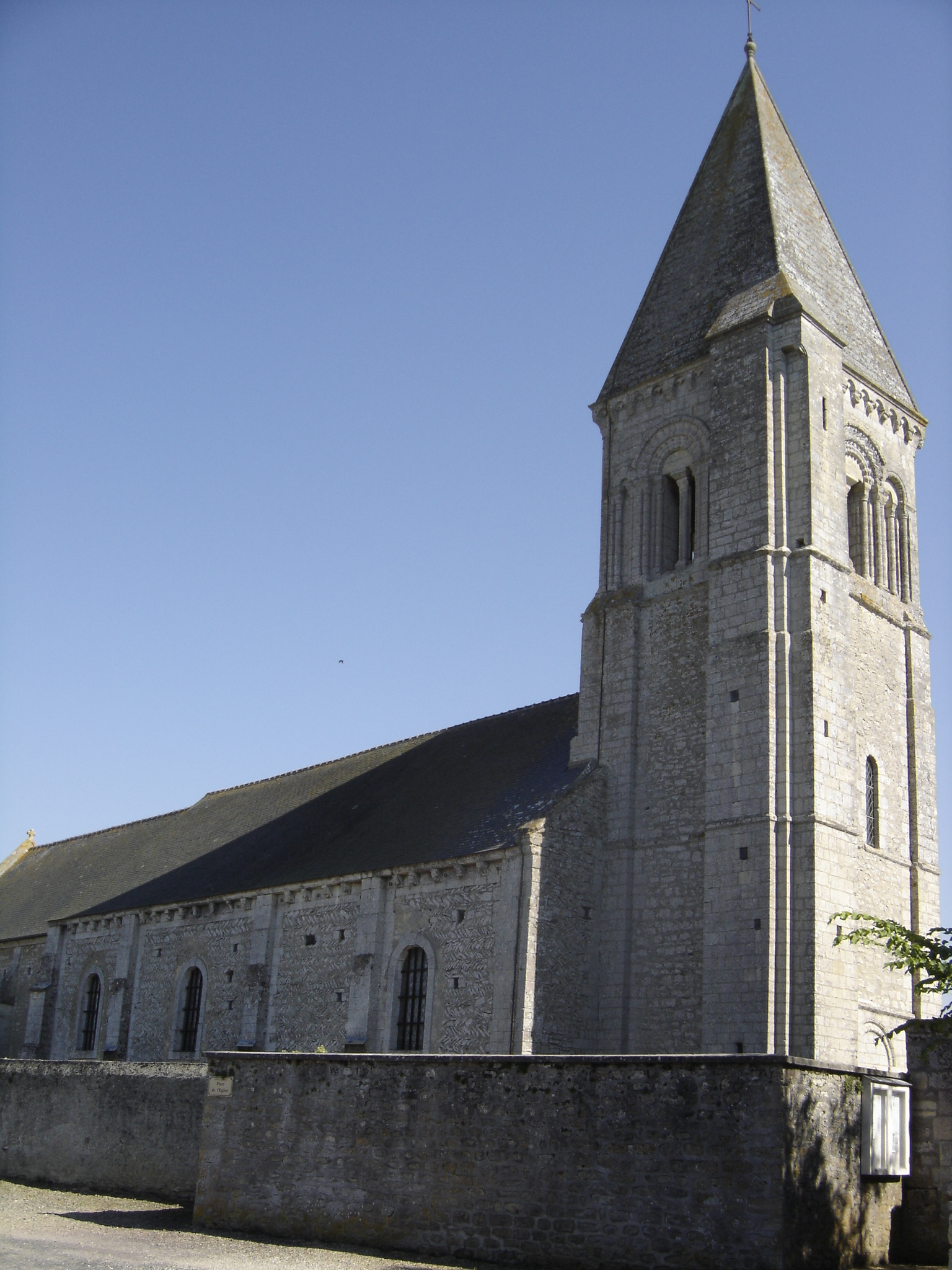
- The church in Vienne-en-Bessin

- Coat of arms
- Location of Vienne-en-Bessin
- Location within France Location within Normandy
- Coordinates: 49°16′48″N 0°36′31″W
- Country: France
- Region: Normandy
- Department: Calvados
- Arrondissement: Bayeux
- Canton: Bayeux
- Intercommunality: CC Bayeux Intercom

Government
  - Mayor (2020–2026): Rémi Françoise
- Area^{1}: 4.10 km^{2} (1.58 sq mi)
- Elevation: 34 m (112 ft)
- Highest elevation: 67 m (220 ft)
- Lowest elevation: 17 m (56 ft)
- Population (2023): 265
  - Density: 64.6/km^{2} (167/sq mi)
- Time zone: UTC+01:00 (CET)
  - Summer (DST): UTC+02:00 (CEST)
- INSEE/Postal code: 14744 /14400
- ^{1} French Land Register data, which excludes lakes, ponds, glaciers > 1 km^{2} (0.386 sq mi or 247 acres) and river estuaries.

Vienne-en-Bessin (French pronunciation: [vjɛn ɑ̃ bɛsɛ̃], literally Vienne in Bessin) is a commune in the Calvados department in the Normandy region in northwestern France.

During the latter stages of the Battle of Normandy it was the home of the British Army 59th (Staffordshire) Infantry Division's battle school.

== Population ==
Historical population
Year	Pop.	±% p.a.
1968	137	—
1975	122	−1.64%
1982	152	+3.19%
1990	198	+3.36%
1999	200	+0.11%
2007	261	+3.38%
2012	279	+1.34%
2017	297	+1.26%
2023	265	−1.88%
Source: INSEE

== See also ==
- Communes of the Calvados department
