= Cussy =

- Commune
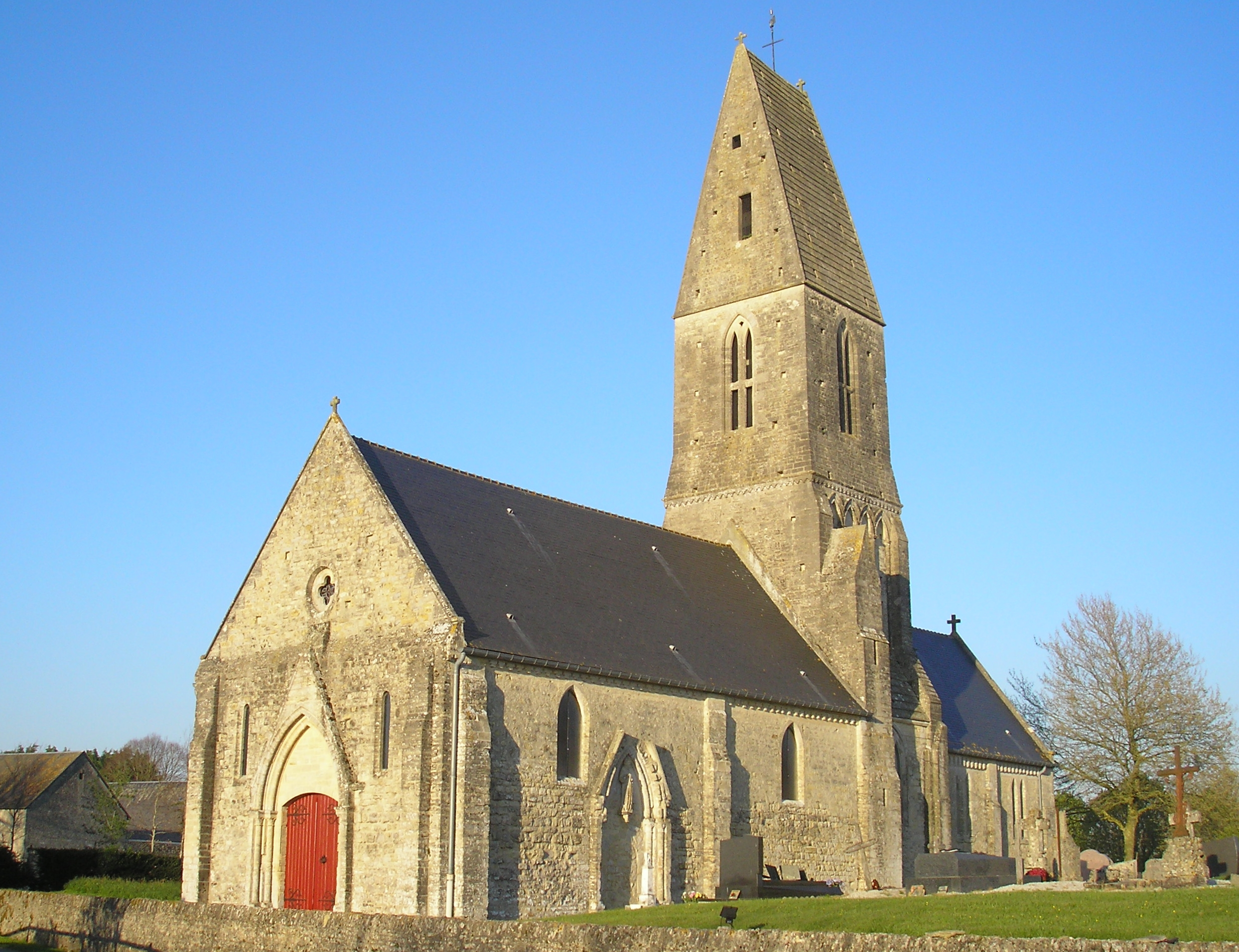
- The church in Cussy
- Location of Cussy
- Location within France Location within Normandy
- Coordinates: 49°17′04″N 0°45′41″W
- Country: France
- Region: Normandy
- Department: Calvados
- Arrondissement: Bayeux
- Canton: Bayeux
- Intercommunality: CC Bayeux Intercom

Government
  - Mayor (2020–2026): Catherine Dos Santos
- Area^{1}: 2.34 km^{2} (0.90 sq mi)
- Elevation: 55 m (180 ft)
- Highest elevation: 68 m (223 ft)
- Lowest elevation: 29 m (95 ft)
- Population (2023): 167
  - Density: 71.4/km^{2} (185/sq mi)
- Time zone: UTC+01:00 (CET)
  - Summer (DST): UTC+02:00 (CEST)
- INSEE/Postal code: 14214 /14400
- ^{1} French Land Register data, which excludes lakes, ponds, glaciers > 1 km^{2} (0.386 sq mi or 247 acres) and river estuaries.

Cussy (French pronunciation: [kysi]) is a commune in the Calvados department in the Normandy region in northwestern France.

== Population ==
Historical population
Year	Pop.	±% p.a.
1968	103	—
1975	150	+5.52%
1982	177	+2.39%
1990	173	−0.29%
1999	150	−1.57%
2007	131	−1.68%
2012	162	+4.34%
2017	186	+2.80%
2023	167	−1.78%
Source: INSEE

== See also ==
- Communes of the Calvados department
