= Communauté de communes de Bayeux Intercom =

Intercommunal structure in Normandy, France

Bayeux Intercom
- Communauté de communes
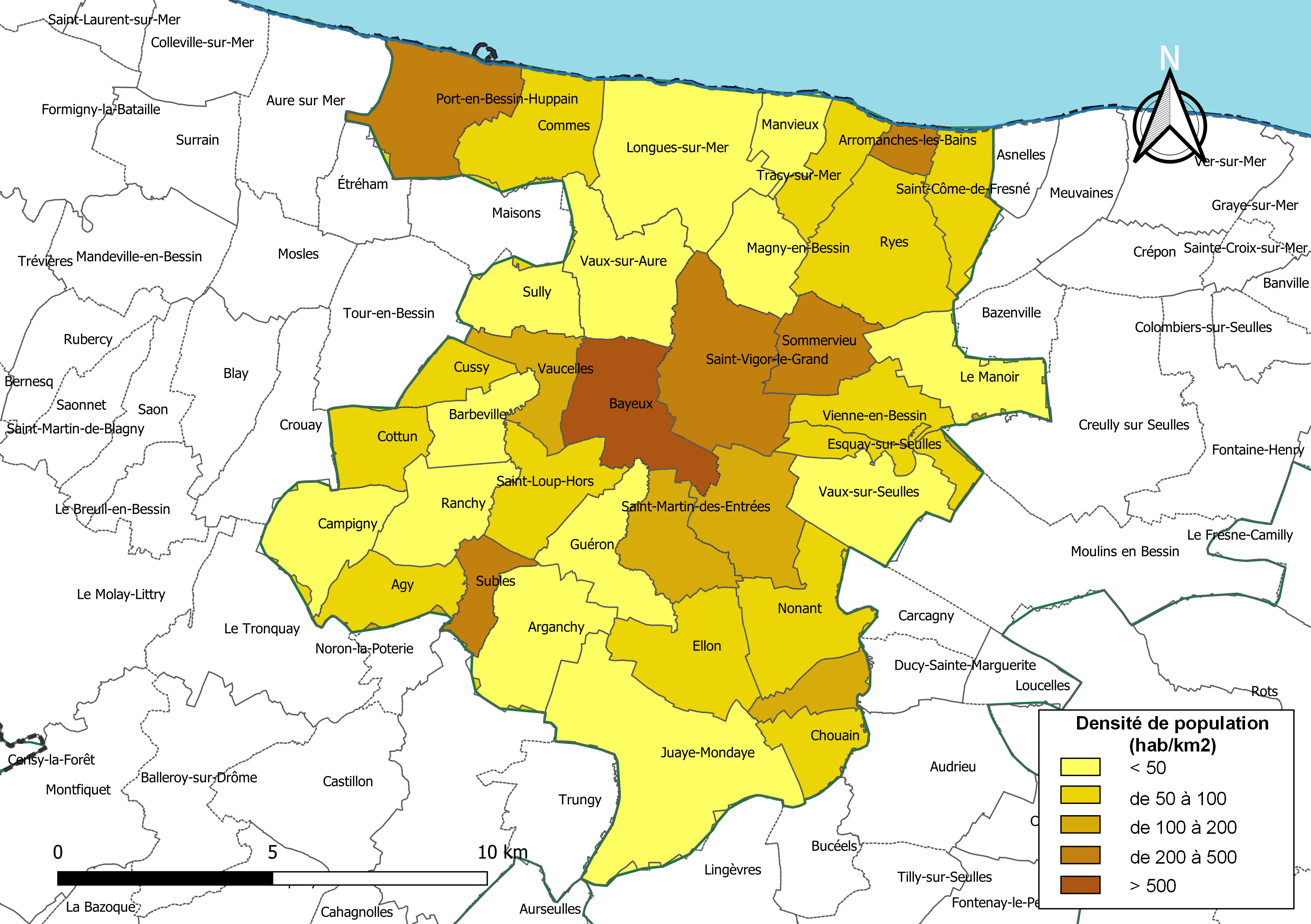
- Map of Bayeux intercom
- Coordinates: 49°29′N 07°06′W
- Country: France
- Region: Normandy
- Department: Calvados
- No. of communes: {{{nbcomm}}}
- Established: 1994

Government
  - President: Patrick Gomont
- Area: 199.0 km^{2} (76.8 sq mi)
- Population (2021): 29,919
  - Density: 150.3/km^{2} (389.4/sq mi)
- Website: www.bayeux-intercom.fr

Bayeux Intercom is the intercommunal structure centered on the town of Bayeux. It is located in the Calvados Department in the region of Normandy, northwestern France. It was created in 1994 and its seat is in Bayeux. Its area is 199 square kilometers. As of 2021 its population was 29,919, with 12,775 people living in Bayeux proper.

== Composition ==
Bayeux Intercom is made up of the following 36 communes:

1. Agy
2. Arganchy
3. Arromanches-les-Bains
4. Barbeville
5. Bayeux
6. Campigny
7. Chouain
8. Commes
9. Condé-sur-Seulles
10. Cottun
11. Cussy
12. Ellon
13. Esquay-sur-Seulles
14. Guéron
15. Juaye-Mondaye
16. Longues-sur-Mer
17. Magny-en-Bessin
18. Le Manoir
19. Manvieux
20. Monceaux-en-Bessin
21. Nonant
22. Port-en-Bessin-Huppain
23. Ranchy
24. Ryes
25. Saint-Côme-de-Fresné
26. Saint-Loup-Hors
27. Saint-Martin-des-Entrées
28. Saint-Vigor-le-Grand
29. Sommervieu
30. Subles
31. Sully
32. Tracy-sur-Mer
33. Vaucelles
34. Vaux-sur-Aure
35. Vaux-sur-Seulles
36. Vienne-en-Bessin
