= Saint-Vigor-le-Grand =

- Commune
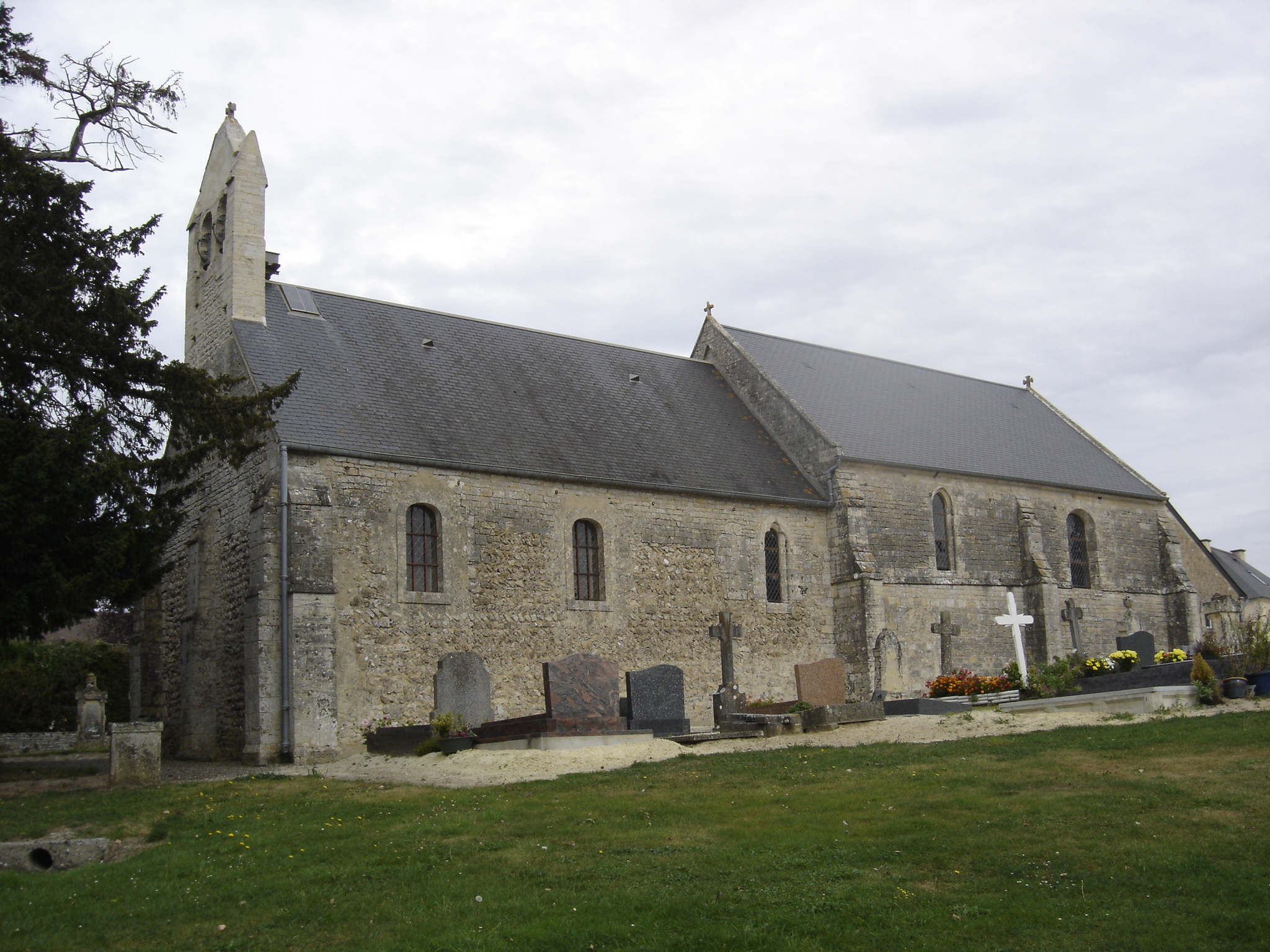
- The church in Saint-Vigor-le-Grand

- Coat of arms
- Location of Saint-Vigor-le-Grand
- Location within France Location within Normandy
- Coordinates: 49°16′53″N 0°41′18″W
- Country: France
- Region: Normandy
- Department: Calvados
- Arrondissement: Bayeux
- Canton: Bayeux
- Intercommunality: CC Bayeux Intercom

Government
  - Mayor (2020–2026): Benoît Ferrut
- Area^{1}: 9.69 km^{2} (3.74 sq mi)
- Elevation: 51 m (167 ft)
- Highest elevation: 75 m (246 ft)
- Lowest elevation: 32 m (105 ft)
- Population (2023): 2,443
  - Density: 252/km^{2} (653/sq mi)
- Time zone: UTC+01:00 (CET)
  - Summer (DST): UTC+02:00 (CEST)
- INSEE/Postal code: 14663 /14400
- ^{1} French Land Register data, which excludes lakes, ponds, glaciers > 1 km^{2} (0.386 sq mi or 247 acres) and river estuaries.

Saint-Vigor-le-Grand (French pronunciation: [sɛ̃ viɡɔʁ lə ɡʁɑ̃]) is a commune in the Calvados department in the Normandy region in northwestern France.

== International relations ==
Saint-Vigor-le-Grand is twinned with Colden Common, United Kingdom.

== Population ==
Historical population
Year	Pop.	±% p.a.
1968	1,304	—
1975	1,588	+2.85%
1982	1,752	+1.41%
1990	2,032	+1.87%
1999	1,901	−0.74%
2007	2,030	+0.82%
2012	2,087	+0.56%
2017	2,438	+3.16%
2023	2,443	+0.03%
Source: INSEE

== See also ==
- Communes of the Calvados department
