= Saint-Loup-Hors =

- Commune
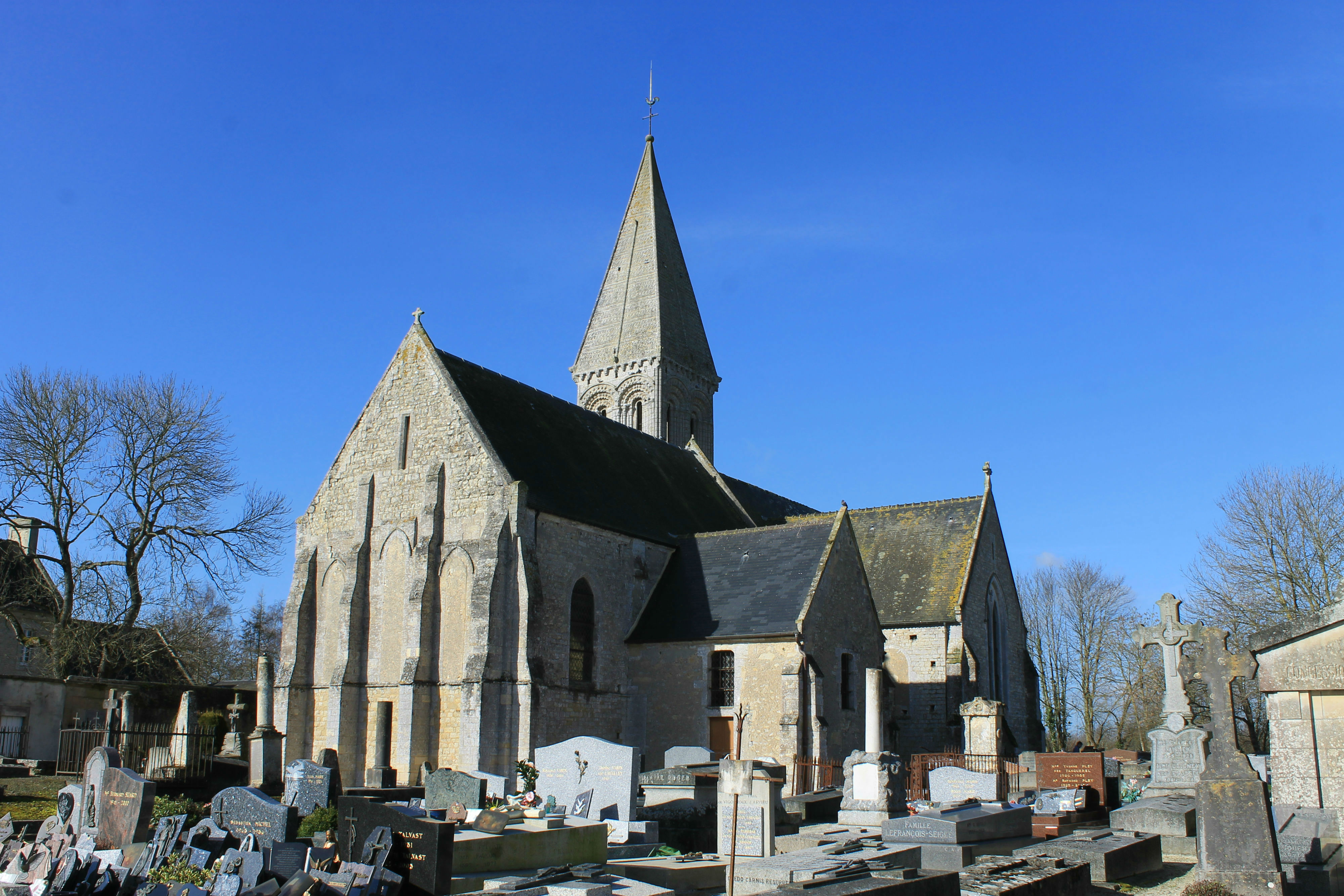
- The church in Saint-Loup-Hors

- Coat of arms
- Location of Saint-Loup-Hors
- Location within France Location within Normandy
- Coordinates: 49°15′33″N 0°43′09″W
- Country: France
- Region: Normandy
- Department: Calvados
- Arrondissement: Bayeux
- Canton: Bayeux
- Intercommunality: CC Bayeux Intercom

Government
  - Mayor (2020–2026): Samuel Dumas
- Area^{1}: 5.29 km^{2} (2.04 sq mi)
- Elevation: 60 m (200 ft)
- Highest elevation: 82 m (269 ft)
- Lowest elevation: 27 m (89 ft)
- Population (2023): 504
  - Density: 95.3/km^{2} (247/sq mi)
- Time zone: UTC+01:00 (CET)
  - Summer (DST): UTC+02:00 (CEST)
- INSEE/Postal code: 14609 /14400
- ^{1} French Land Register data, which excludes lakes, ponds, glaciers > 1 km^{2} (0.386 sq mi or 247 acres) and river estuaries.

Saint-Loup-Hors (French pronunciation: [sɛ̃ lu ɔʁ]) is a commune in the Calvados department in the Normandy region in northwestern France.

== Population ==
Historical population
Year	Pop.	±% p.a.
1968	244	—
1975	238	−0.36%
1982	282	+2.45%
1990	293	+0.48%
1999	283	−0.39%
2007	287	+0.18%
2012	382	+5.89%
2017	512	+6.03%
2023	504	−0.26%
Source: INSEE

== See also ==
- Communes of the Calvados department
