= Saint-Martin-des-Entrées =

- Commune
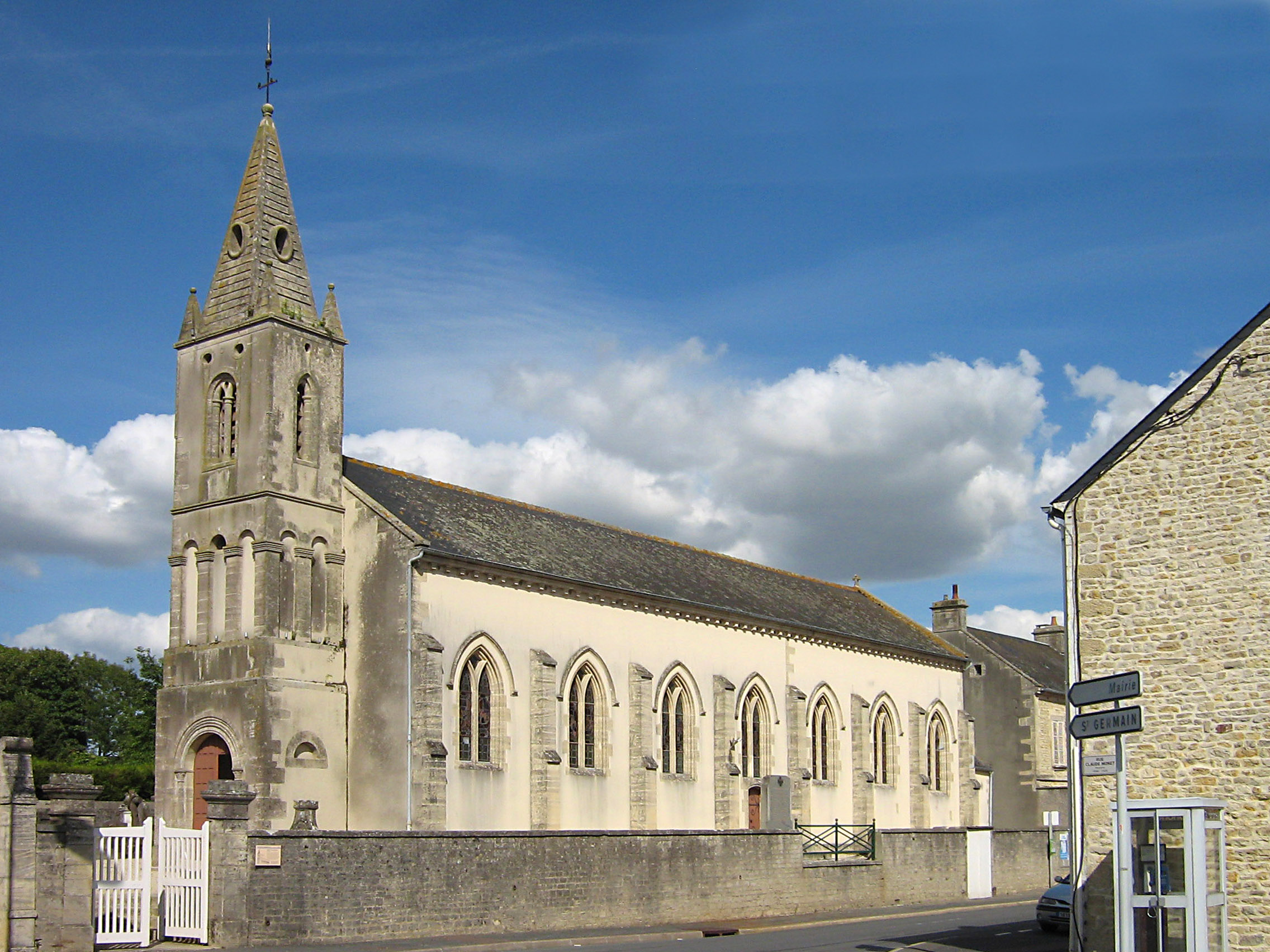
- The church in Saint-Martin-des-Entrées

- Coat of arms
- Location of Saint-Martin-des-Entrées
- Location within France Location within Normandy
- Coordinates: 49°16′06″N 0°40′17″W
- Country: France
- Region: Normandy
- Department: Calvados
- Arrondissement: Bayeux
- Canton: Bayeux
- Intercommunality: CC Bayeux Intercom

Government
  - Mayor (2020–2026): Henry Lemaitre
- Area^{1}: 5.99 km^{2} (2.31 sq mi)
- Elevation: 62 m (203 ft)
- Highest elevation: 82 m (269 ft)
- Lowest elevation: 46 m (151 ft)
- Population (2023): 784
  - Density: 131/km^{2} (339/sq mi)
- Time zone: UTC+01:00 (CET)
  - Summer (DST): UTC+02:00 (CEST)
- INSEE/Postal code: 14630 /14400
- ^{1} French Land Register data, which excludes lakes, ponds, glaciers > 1 km^{2} (0.386 sq mi or 247 acres) and river estuaries.

Saint-Martin-des-Entrées (French pronunciation: [sɛ̃ maʁtɛ̃ de.z‿ɑ̃tʁe]) is a commune in the Calvados department in the Normandy region in northwestern France.

== Population ==
Historical population
Year	Pop.	±% p.a.
1968	291	—
1975	313	+1.05%
1982	458	+5.59%
1990	487	+0.77%
1999	500	+0.29%
2007	494	−0.15%
2012	647	+5.54%
2017	686	+1.18%
2023	784	+2.25%
Source: INSEE

== See also ==
- Communes of the Calvados department
