= Nonant =

- Commune
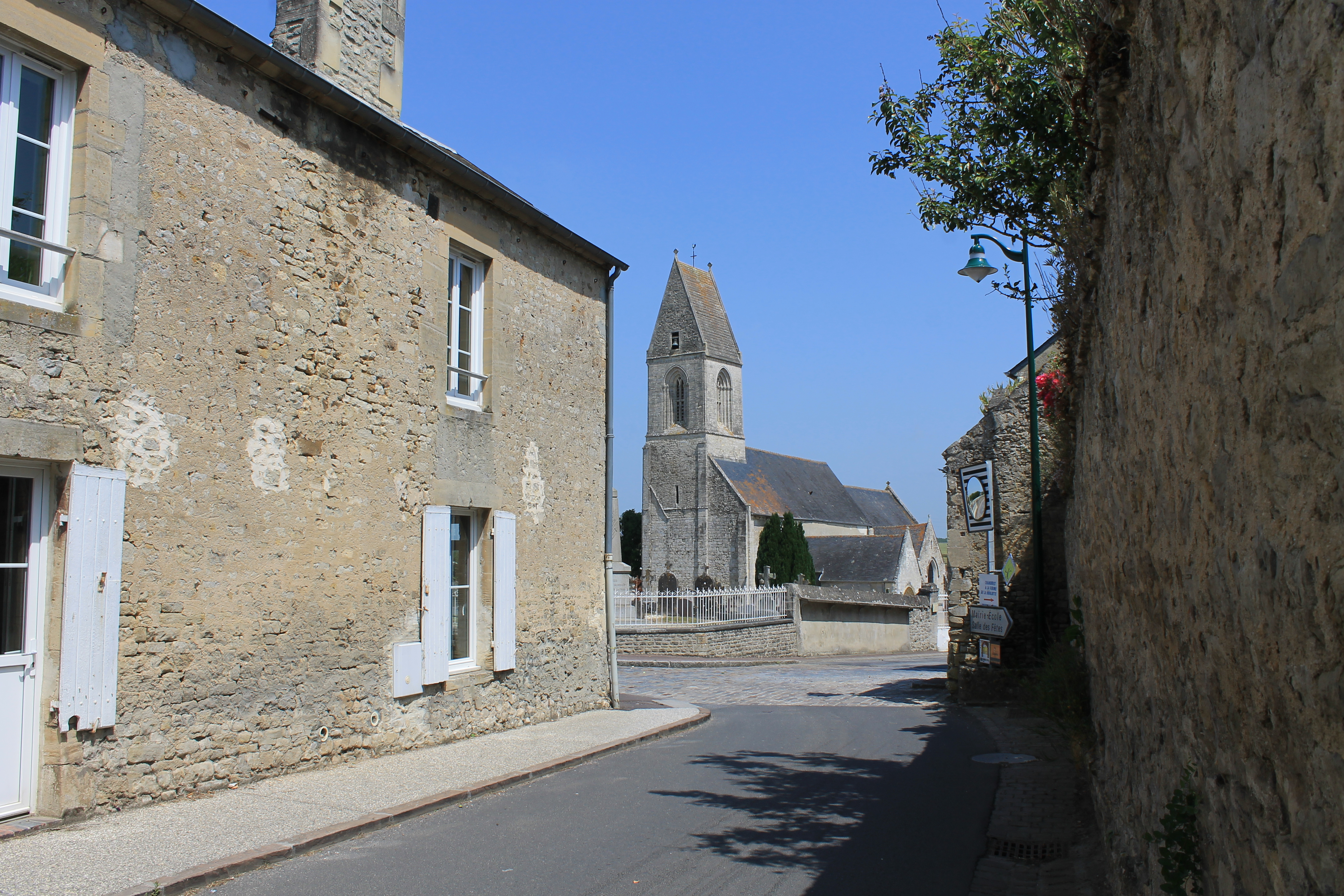
- The church in Nonant
- Location of Nonant
- Location within France Location within Normandy
- Coordinates: 49°14′35″N 0°38′15″W
- Country: France
- Region: Normandy
- Department: Calvados
- Arrondissement: Bayeux
- Canton: Bayeux
- Intercommunality: CC Bayeux Intercom

Government
  - Mayor (2020–2026): Sébastien Berard
- Area^{1}: 6.82 km^{2} (2.63 sq mi)
- Elevation: 64 m (210 ft)
- Highest elevation: 86 m (282 ft)
- Lowest elevation: 27 m (89 ft)
- Population (2023): 520
  - Density: 76/km^{2} (200/sq mi)
- Time zone: UTC+01:00 (CET)
  - Summer (DST): UTC+02:00 (CEST)
- INSEE/Postal code: 14465 /14400
- ^{1} French Land Register data, which excludes lakes, ponds, glaciers > 1 km^{2} (0.386 sq mi or 247 acres) and river estuaries.

Nonant (French pronunciation: [nɔnɑ̃]) is a commune in the Calvados department in the Normandy region in northwestern France.

== Population ==
Historical population
| Year | Pop. | ±% p.a. |
|---|---|---|
| 1968 | 250 | — |
| 1975 | 266 | +0.89% |
| 1982 | 361 | +4.46% |
| 1990 | 388 | +0.91% |
| 1999 | 384 | −0.12% |
| 2007 | 432 | +1.48% |
| 2012 | 477 | +2.00% |
| 2017 | 496 | +0.78% |
| 2023 | 520 | +0.79% |
Source: INSEE

== See also ==
- Communes of the Calvados department
