= Tracy-sur-Mer =

- Commune
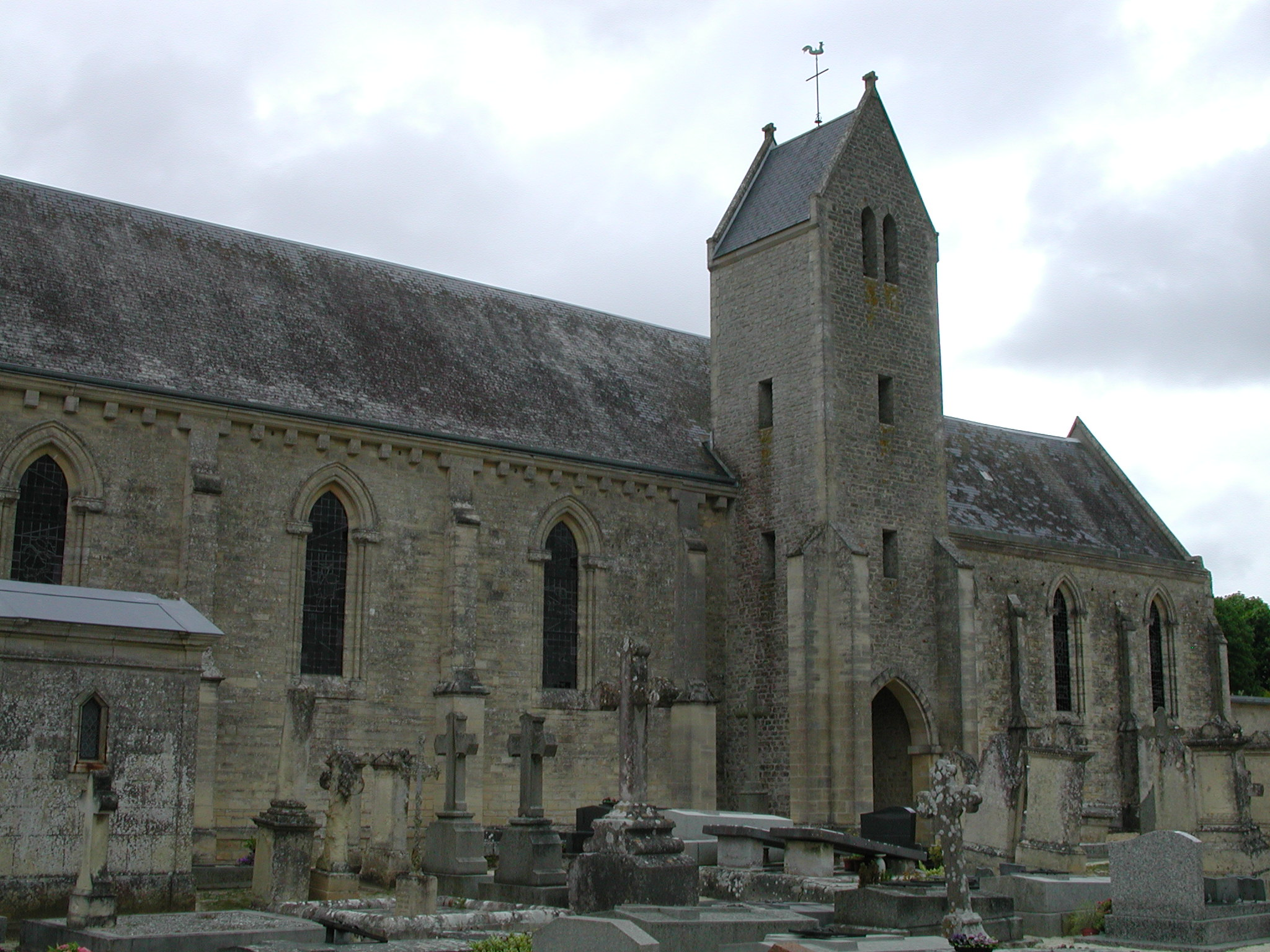
- Church of Saint Martin

- Coat of arms
- Location of Tracy-sur-Mer
- Location within France Location within Normandy
- Coordinates: 49°20′10″N 0°38′31″W
- Country: France
- Region: Normandy
- Department: Calvados
- Arrondissement: Bayeux
- Canton: Bayeux
- Intercommunality: CC Bayeux Intercom

Government
  - Mayor (2020–2026): Daniel Cattelain
- Area^{1}: 3.72 km^{2} (1.44 sq mi)
- Elevation: 5 m (16 ft)
- Highest elevation: 74 m (243 ft)
- Lowest elevation: 0 m (0 ft)
- Population (2023): 341
  - Density: 91.7/km^{2} (237/sq mi)
- Time zone: UTC+01:00 (CET)
  - Summer (DST): UTC+02:00 (CEST)
- INSEE/Postal code: 14709 /14117
- ^{1} French Land Register data, which excludes lakes, ponds, glaciers > 1 km^{2} (0.386 sq mi or 247 acres) and river estuaries.

Tracy-sur-Mer (French pronunciation: [tʁasi syʁ mɛʁ], literally Tracy on Sea) is a commune in the Calvados department in the Normandy region in northwestern France.

== Geography ==
The commune lies between those of Arromanches, to the east, and Manvieux, to the west. Apart from the main village the commune consists of a cluster of hamlets around the cross-roads at La Rosière (49°19′22″N 0°39′3.50″W). On the main road to Bayeux (the D516) lies the Chateau de La Noë(fr) (also known as the Chateau de Tracy), a manor house dating from the 18 century.

== History ==
The village was part of the west flank of the British 50th (Northumbrian) Infantry Division during the first days of the D-day invasion, in close proximity to the port of Arromanches-les-Bains, also known as Gold Beach.

== Sights ==
Tracy-sur-Mer has a church dedicated to Saint Martin. The building was largely reconstructed in the nineteenth century, but some masonry of the original thirteenth century church remains in the choir. The bell tower was built in 1957.

== Population ==
Historical population
Year	Pop.	±% p.a.
1968	225	—
1975	207	−1.18%
1982	217	+0.68%
1990	252	+1.89%
1999	240	−0.54%
2007	321	+3.70%
2012	359	+2.26%
2017	341	−1.02%
2023	341	+0.00%
Source: INSEE

== See also ==
- Communes of the Calvados department
