= Cottun =

- Commune
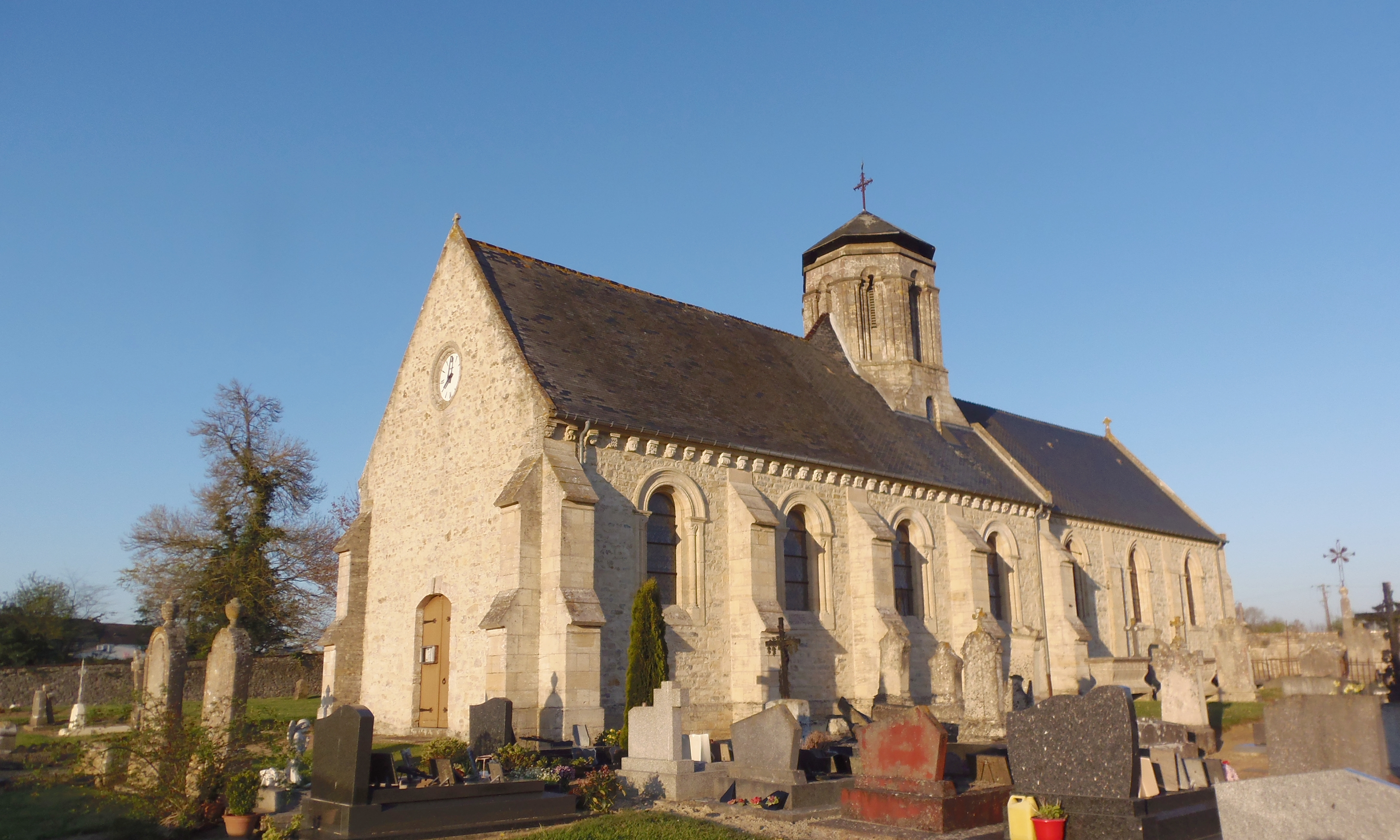
- The church in Cottun

- Coat of arms
- Location of Cottun
- Location within France Location within Normandy
- Coordinates: 49°16′21″N 0°47′32″W
- Country: France
- Region: Normandy
- Department: Calvados
- Arrondissement: Bayeux
- Canton: Bayeux
- Intercommunality: CC Bayeux Intercom

Government
  - Mayor (2020–2026): Jean Oblin
- Area^{1}: 3.77 km^{2} (1.46 sq mi)
- Elevation: 59 m (194 ft)
- Highest elevation: 75 m (246 ft)
- Lowest elevation: 39 m (128 ft)
- Population (2023): 240
  - Density: 64/km^{2} (160/sq mi)
- Time zone: UTC+01:00 (CET)
  - Summer (DST): UTC+02:00 (CEST)
- INSEE/Postal code: 14184 /14400
- ^{1} French Land Register data, which excludes lakes, ponds, glaciers > 1 km^{2} (0.386 sq mi or 247 acres) and river estuaries.

Cottun (French pronunciation: [kɔtœ̃]) is a commune in the Calvados department in the Normandy region in northwestern France.

== Population ==
Historical population
Year	Pop.	±% p.a.
1968	89	—
1975	119	+4.24%
1982	193	+7.15%
1990	175	−1.22%
1999	183	+0.50%
2007	176	−0.49%
2012	191	+1.65%
2017	222	+3.05%
2023	240	+1.31%
Source: INSEE

== See also ==
- Communes of the Calvados department
