= Esquay-sur-Seulles =

- Commune
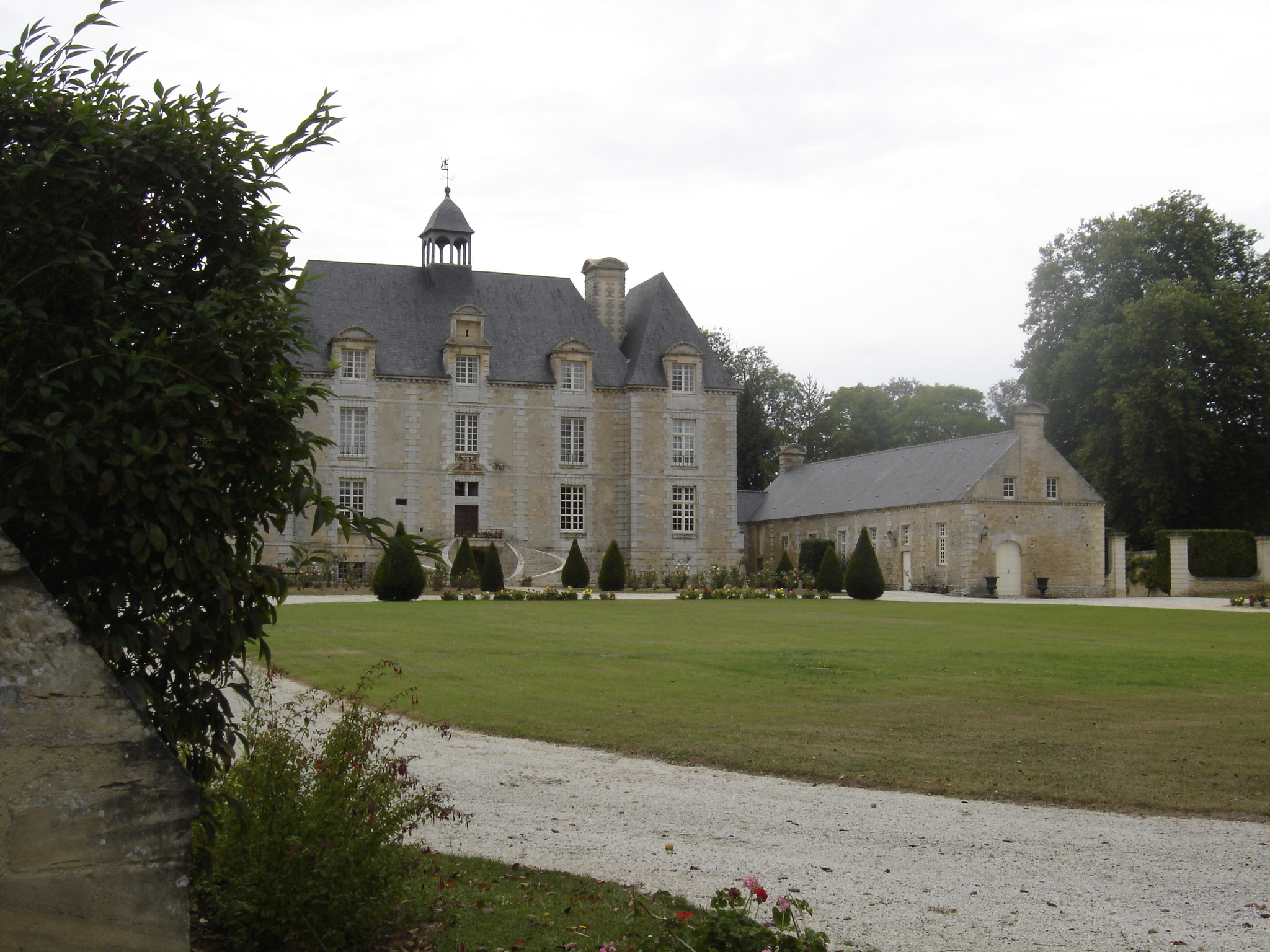
- Chateau

- Coat of arms
- Location of Esquay-sur-Seulles
- Location within France Location within Normandy
- Coordinates: 49°16′24″N 0°37′16″W
- Country: France
- Region: Normandy
- Department: Calvados
- Arrondissement: Bayeux
- Canton: Bayeux
- Intercommunality: CC Bayeux Intercom

Government
  - Mayor (2020–2026): Bruno Russeil
- Area^{1}: 2.90 km^{2} (1.12 sq mi)
- Elevation: 40 m (130 ft)
- Highest elevation: 80 m (260 ft)
- Lowest elevation: 19 m (62 ft)
- Population (2023): 299
  - Density: 103/km^{2} (267/sq mi)
- Time zone: UTC+01:00 (CET)
  - Summer (DST): UTC+02:00 (CEST)
- INSEE/Postal code: 14250 /14400
- ^{1} French Land Register data, which excludes lakes, ponds, glaciers > 1 km^{2} (0.386 sq mi or 247 acres) and river estuaries.

Esquay-sur-Seulles (French pronunciation: [ekɛ syʁ sœl], literally Esquay on Seulles) is a commune in the Calvados department in the Normandy region in northwestern France.

== Population ==
Historical population
Year	Pop.	±% p.a.
1968	258	—
1975	260	+0.11%
1982	278	+0.96%
1990	303	+1.08%
1999	339	+1.26%
2007	346	+0.26%
2012	321	−1.49%
2017	291	−1.94%
2023	299	+0.45%
Source: INSEE

== See also ==
- Communes of the Calvados department
