= Vaucelles =

- Commune
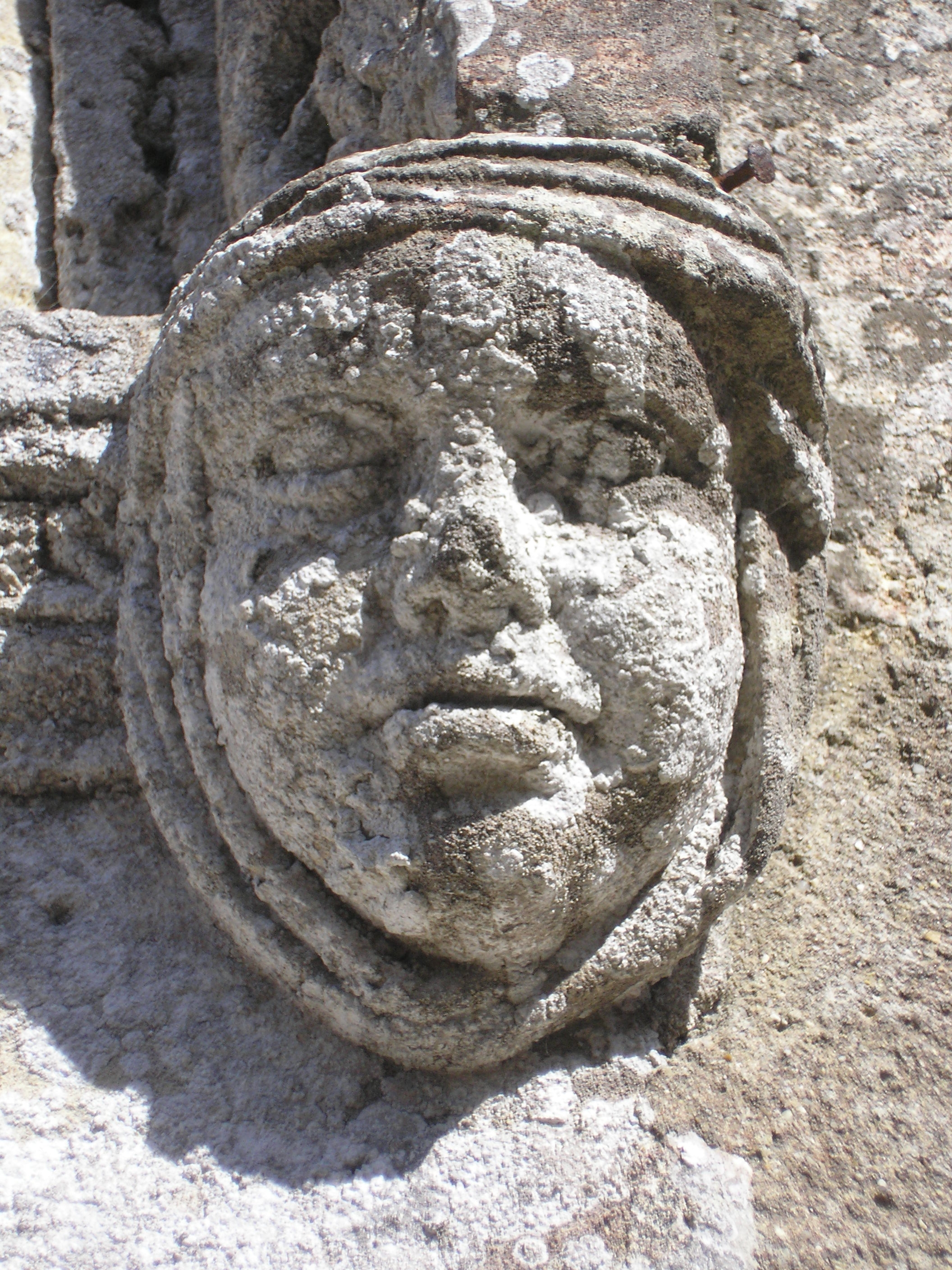
- Sculpture on the church
- Location of Vaucelles
- Location within France Location within Normandy
- Coordinates: 49°17′11″N 0°44′05″W
- Country: France
- Region: Normandy
- Department: Calvados
- Arrondissement: Bayeux
- Canton: Bayeux
- Intercommunality: CC Bayeux Intercom

Government
  - Mayor (2020–2026): Guillaume Gautier-Lair
- Area^{1}: 3.56 km^{2} (1.37 sq mi)
- Elevation: 63 m (207 ft)
- Highest elevation: 64 m (210 ft)
- Lowest elevation: 22 m (72 ft)
- Population (2023): 599
  - Density: 168/km^{2} (436/sq mi)
- Time zone: UTC+01:00 (CET)
  - Summer (DST): UTC+02:00 (CEST)
- INSEE/Postal code: 14728 /14400
- ^{1} French Land Register data, which excludes lakes, ponds, glaciers > 1 km^{2} (0.386 sq mi or 247 acres) and river estuaries.

Vaucelles (French pronunciation: [vosɛl]) is a commune located to the west of Bayeux in the Calvados department in the Normandy region in northwestern France.

== Population ==
Historical population
Year	Pop.	±% p.a.
1968	187	—
1975	192	+0.38%
1982	195	+0.22%
1990	217	+1.35%
1999	213	−0.21%
2007	310	+4.80%
2012	366	+3.38%
2017	455	+4.45%
2023	599	+4.69%
Source: INSEE

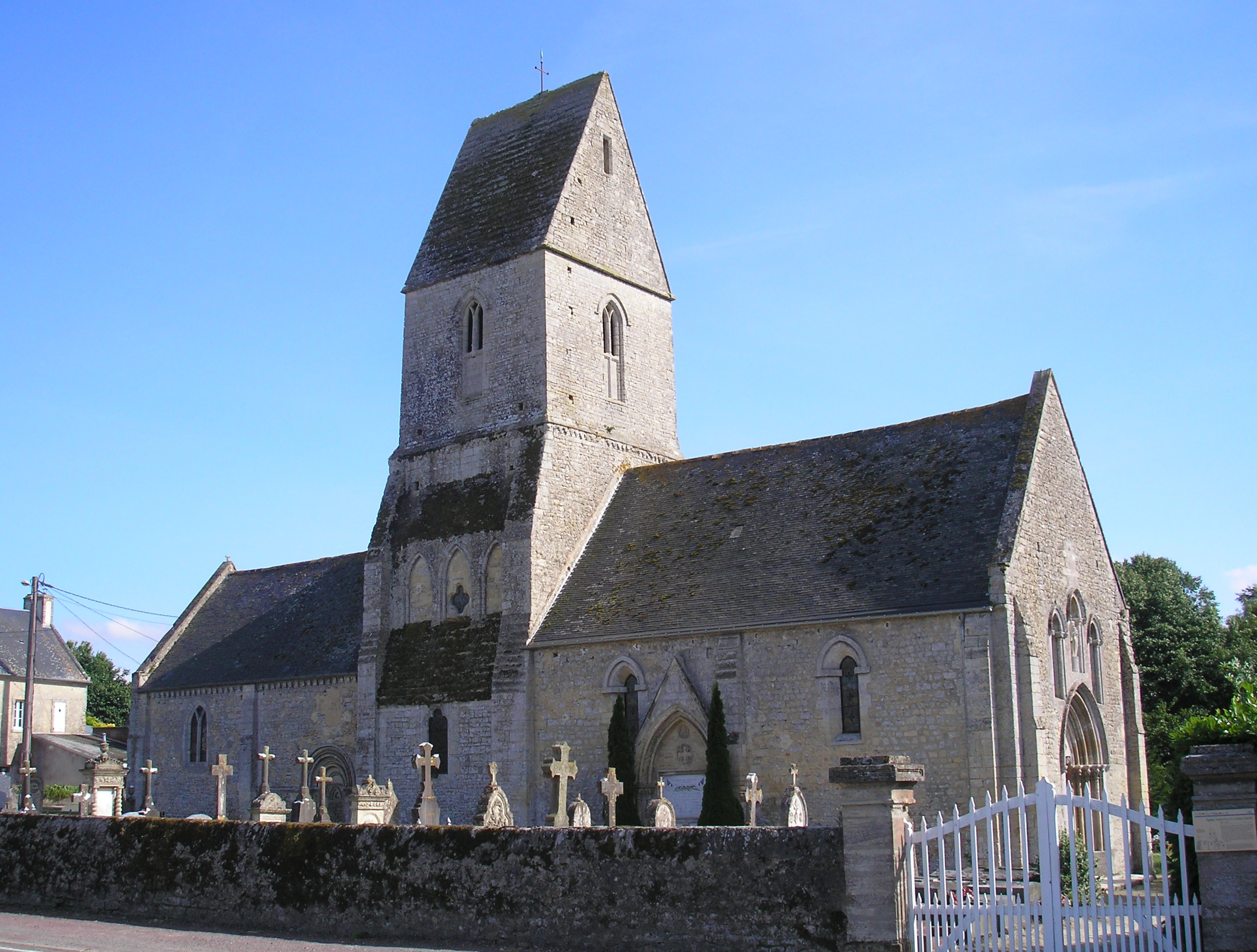
Vaucelles church

== See also ==
- Communes of the Calvados department
