= Campigny, Calvados =

Campigny
- Commune
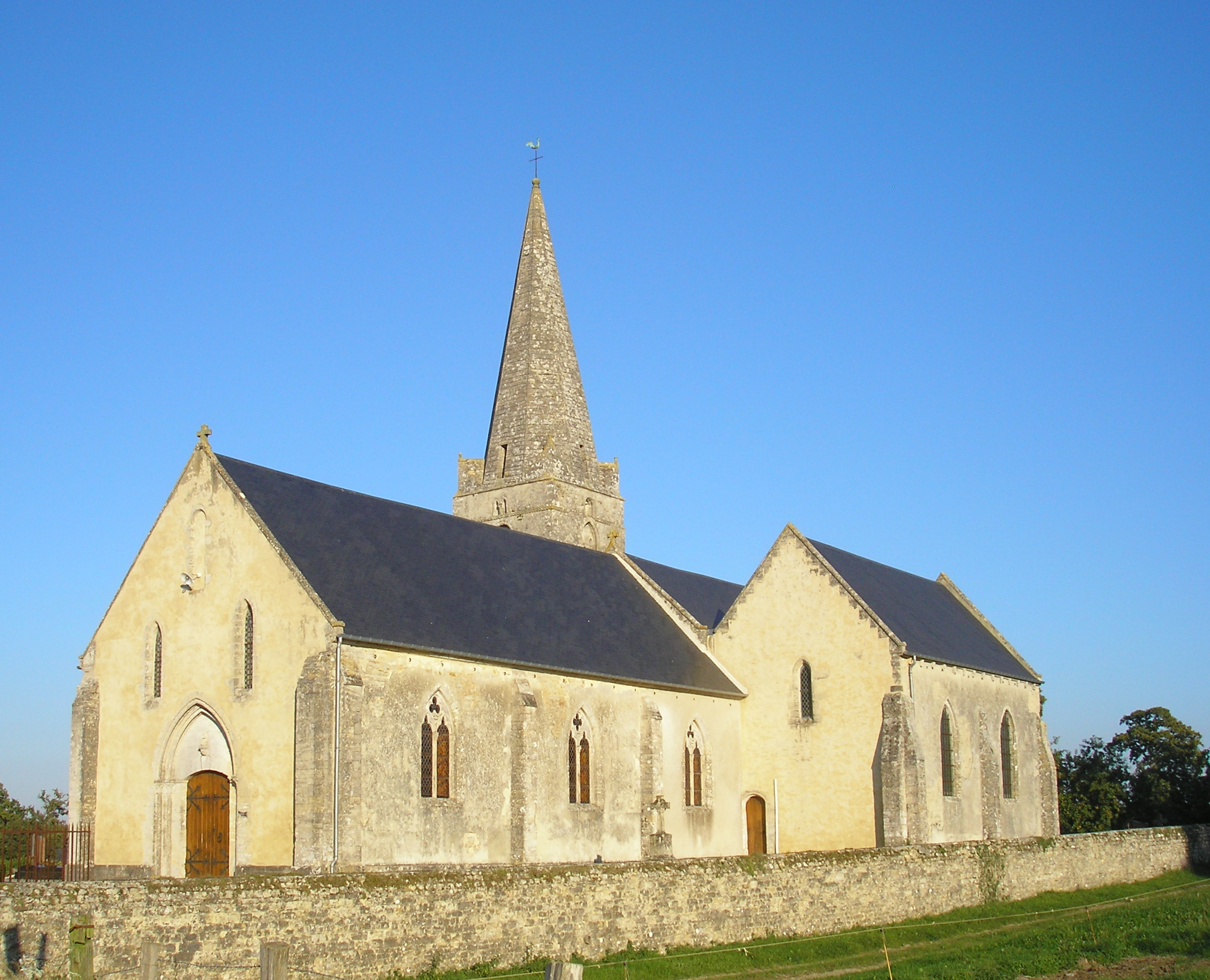
- The church in Campigny
- Location of Campigny
- Location within France Location within Normandy
- Coordinates: 49°14′57″N 0°47′56″W
- Country: France
- Region: Normandy
- Department: Calvados
- Arrondissement: Bayeux
- Canton: Bayeux
- Intercommunality: CC Bayeux Intercom

Government
  - Mayor (2020–2026): Jackie Fauvel
- Area^{1}: 5.61 km^{2} (2.17 sq mi)
- Elevation: 100 m (330 ft)
- Highest elevation: 77 m (253 ft)
- Lowest elevation: 38 m (125 ft)
- Population (2023): 184
  - Density: 32.8/km^{2} (84.9/sq mi)
- Time zone: UTC+01:00 (CET)
  - Summer (DST): UTC+02:00 (CEST)
- INSEE/Postal code: 14130 /14490
- ^{1} French Land Register data, which excludes lakes, ponds, glaciers > 1 km^{2} (0.386 sq mi or 247 acres) and river estuaries.

Campigny (French pronunciation: [kɑ̃piɲi]) is a commune in the Calvados department and Normandy region of north-western France.

== Population ==
Historical population
Year	Pop.	±% p.a.
1968	173	—
1975	152	−1.83%
1982	123	−2.98%
1990	151	+2.60%
1999	155	+0.29%
2007	175	+1.53%
2012	193	+1.98%
2017	189	−0.42%
2023	184	−0.45%
Source: INSEE

== See also ==
- Communes of the Calvados department
