= Subles =

- Commune
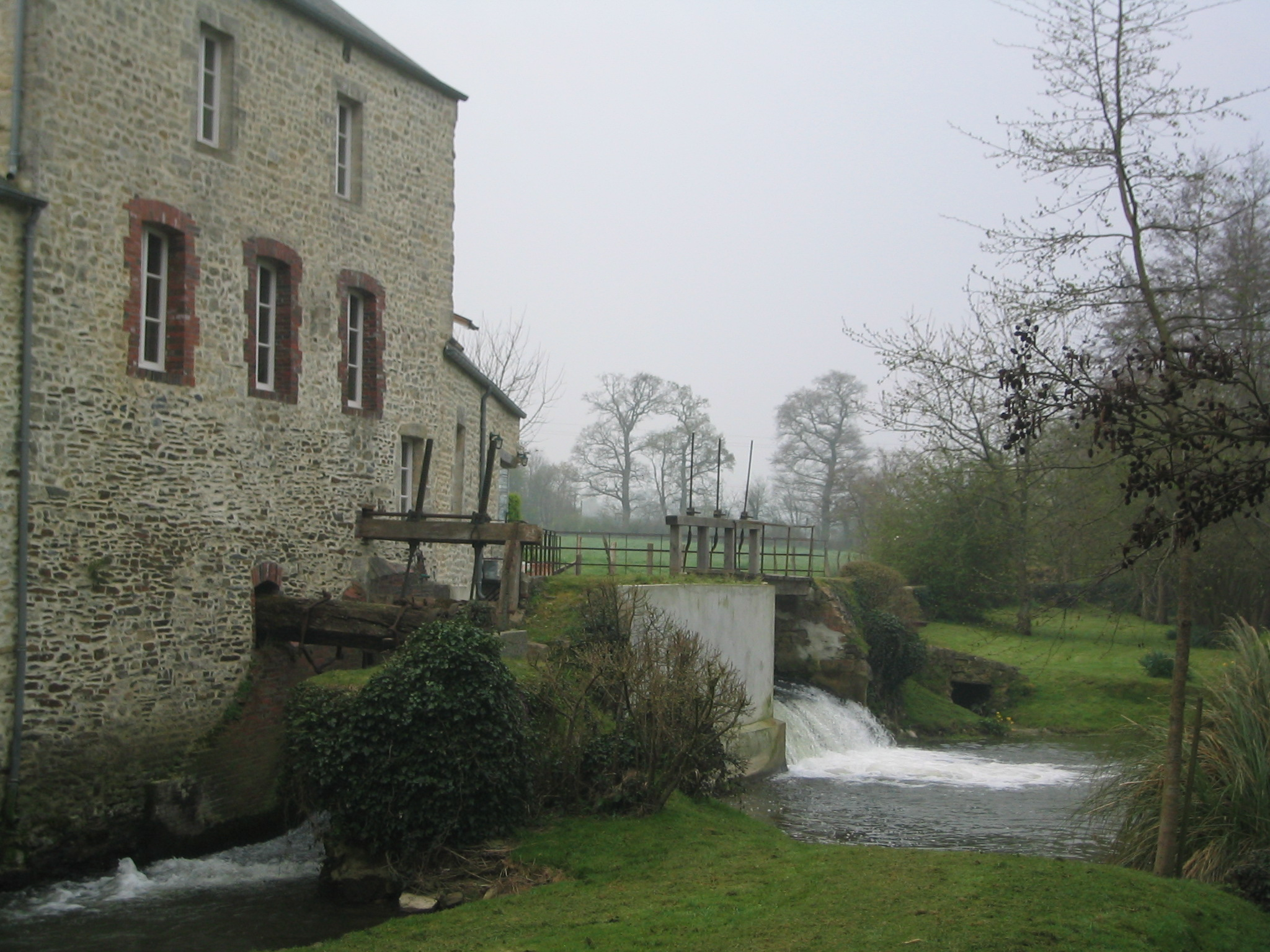
- The 18th-century "Moulin de Hard"
- Location of Subles
- Location within France Location within Normandy
- Coordinates: 49°14′30″N 0°44′59″W
- Country: France
- Region: Normandy
- Department: Calvados
- Arrondissement: Bayeux
- Canton: Bayeux
- Intercommunality: CC Bayeux Intercom

Government
  - Mayor (2020–2026): Thierry Dubosq
- Area^{1}: 2.44 km^{2} (0.94 sq mi)
- Elevation: 48 m (157 ft)
- Highest elevation: 82 m (269 ft)
- Lowest elevation: 30 m (98 ft)
- Population (2023): 690
  - Density: 280/km^{2} (730/sq mi)
- Time zone: UTC+01:00 (CET)
  - Summer (DST): UTC+02:00 (CEST)
- INSEE/Postal code: 14679 /14400
- ^{1} French Land Register data, which excludes lakes, ponds, glaciers > 1 km^{2} (0.386 sq mi or 247 acres) and river estuaries.

Subles (French pronunciation: [sybl]) is a commune in the Calvados department in the Normandy region in northwestern France.

== Population ==
Historical population
Year	Pop.	±% p.a.
1968	220	—
1975	315	+5.26%
1982	349	+1.48%
1990	574	+6.42%
1999	571	−0.06%
2007	584	+0.28%
2012	663	+2.57%
2017	672	+0.27%
2023	690	+0.44%
Source: INSEE

== See also ==
- Communes of the Calvados department
