= Le Manoir, Calvados =

Le Manoir
- Commune
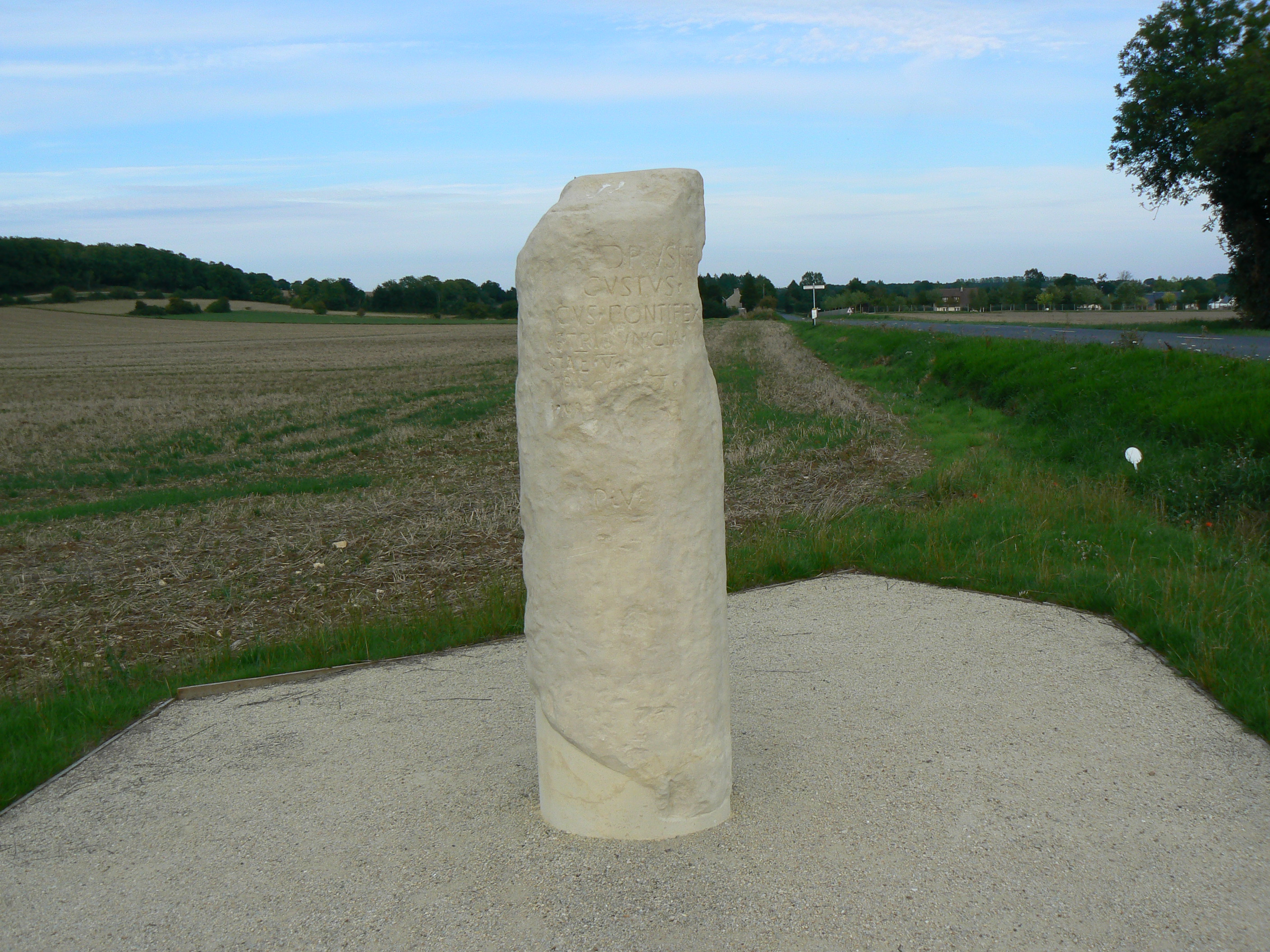
- Milestone

- Coat of arms
- Location of Le Manoir
- Location within France Location within Normandy
- Coordinates: 49°17′04″N 0°35′36″W
- Country: France
- Region: Normandy
- Department: Calvados
- Arrondissement: Bayeux
- Canton: Bayeux
- Intercommunality: CC Bayeux Intercom

Government
  - Mayor (2020–2026): Yves Le Guillois
- Area^{1}: 5.88 km^{2} (2.27 sq mi)
- Elevation: 28 m (92 ft)
- Highest elevation: 64 m (210 ft)
- Lowest elevation: 12 m (39 ft)
- Population (2023): 195
  - Density: 33.2/km^{2} (85.9/sq mi)
- Time zone: UTC+01:00 (CET)
  - Summer (DST): UTC+02:00 (CEST)
- INSEE/Postal code: 14400 /14400
- ^{1} French Land Register data, which excludes lakes, ponds, glaciers > 1 km^{2} (0.386 sq mi or 247 acres) and river estuaries.

Le Manoir (French pronunciation: [lə manwaʁ]) is a commune in the Calvados department in the Normandy region in northwestern France.

== Population ==
Historical population
Year	Pop.	±% p.a.
1968	145	—
1975	147	+0.20%
1982	114	−3.57%
1990	107	−0.79%
1999	109	+0.21%
2007	207	+8.35%
2012	195	−1.19%
2017	219	+2.35%
2023	195	−1.92%
Source: INSEE

== See also ==
- Communes of the Calvados department
