= Manvieux =

- Commune
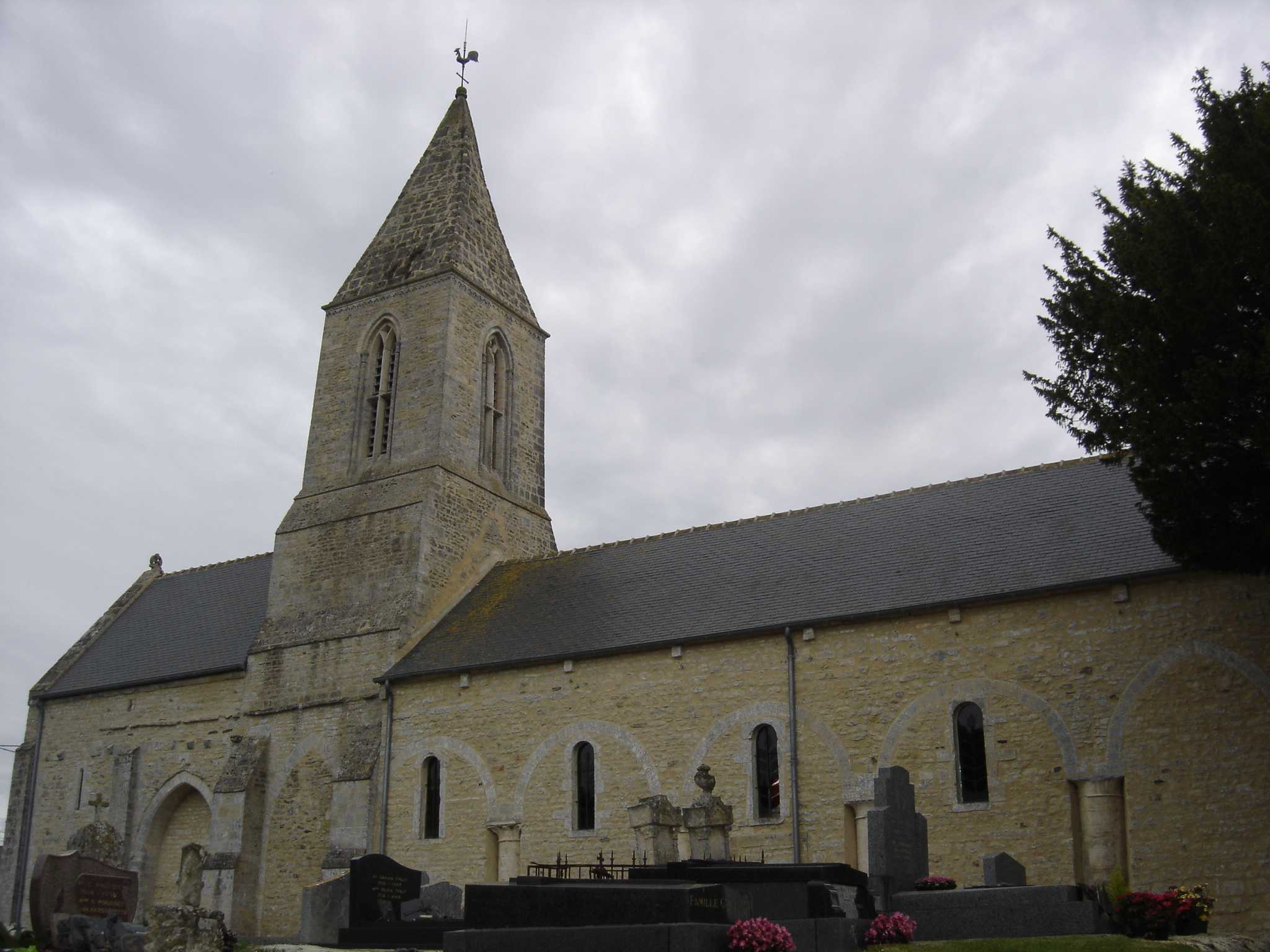
- The church in Manvieux

- Coat of arms
- Location of Manvieux
- Location within France Location within Normandy
- Coordinates: 49°20′15″N 0°39′13″W
- Country: France
- Region: Normandy
- Department: Calvados
- Arrondissement: Bayeux
- Canton: Bayeux
- Intercommunality: CC Bayeux Intercom

Government
  - Mayor (2020–2026): Patrice Folliot
- Area^{1}: 2.82 km^{2} (1.09 sq mi)
- Elevation: 54 m (177 ft)
- Highest elevation: 72 m (236 ft)
- Lowest elevation: 0 m (0 ft)
- Population (2023): 129
  - Density: 45.7/km^{2} (118/sq mi)
- Time zone: UTC+01:00 (CET)
  - Summer (DST): UTC+02:00 (CEST)
- INSEE/Postal code: 14401 /14117
- ^{1} French Land Register data, which excludes lakes, ponds, glaciers > 1 km^{2} (0.386 sq mi or 247 acres) and river estuaries.

Manvieux (French pronunciation: [mɑ̃vjø]) is a commune in the Calvados department in the Normandy region in northwestern France.

== Population ==
Historical population
Year	Pop.	±% p.a.
1968	79	—
1975	61	−3.63%
1982	53	−1.99%
1990	82	+5.61%
1999	107	+3.00%
2007	113	+0.68%
2012	124	+1.88%
2017	131	+1.10%
2023	129	−0.26%
Source: INSEE

== See also ==
- Communes of the Calvados department
