= Commes =

- Commune
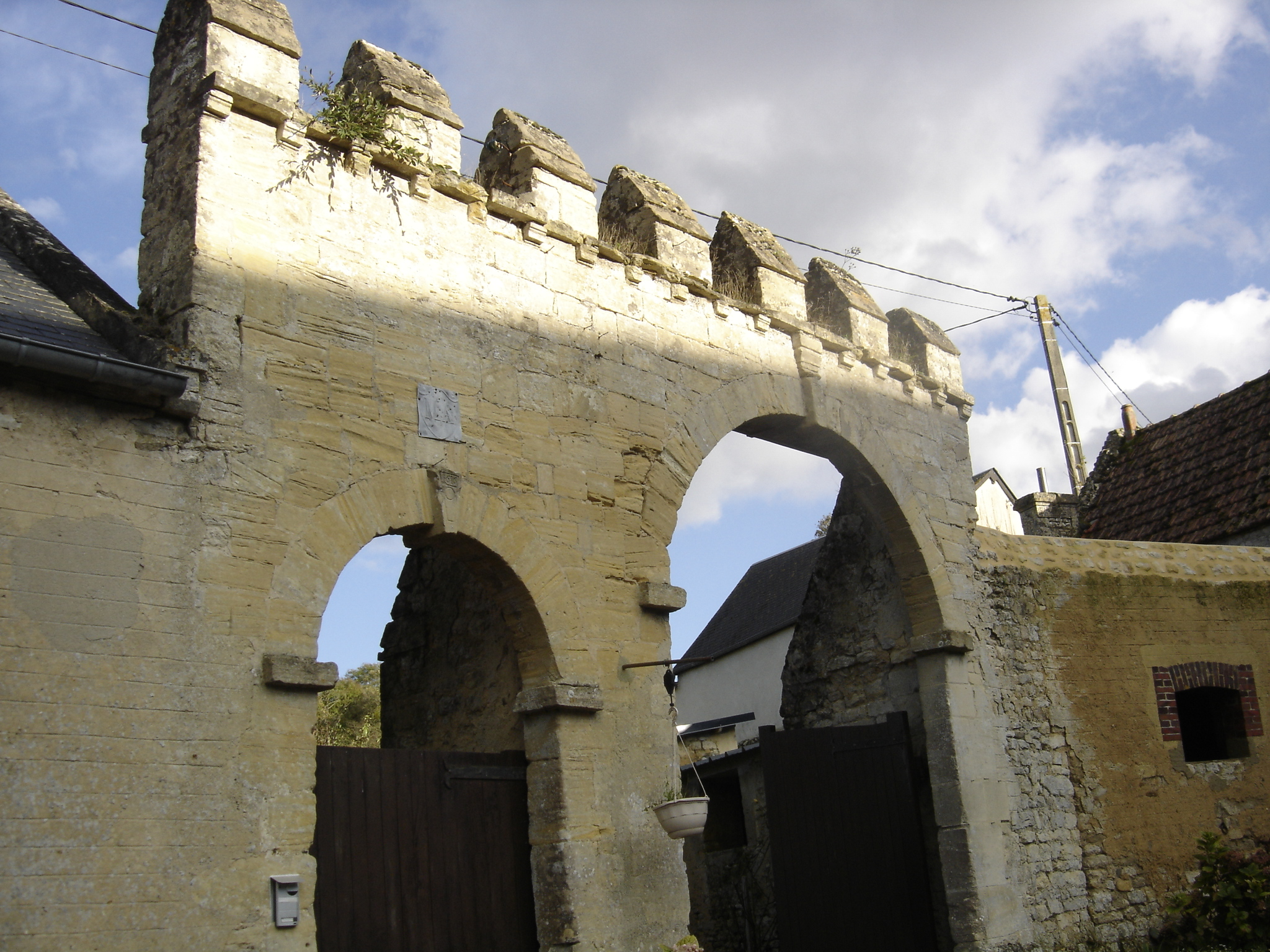
- Seventeenth-century gate

- Coat of arms
- Location of Commes
- Location within France Location within Normandy
- Coordinates: 49°20′19″N 0°44′05″W
- Country: France
- Region: Normandy
- Department: Calvados
- Arrondissement: Bayeux
- Canton: Bayeux
- Intercommunality: CC Bayeux Intercom

Government
  - Mayor (2020–2026): Fernand Poret
- Area^{1}: 6.64 km^{2} (2.56 sq mi)
- Elevation: 66 m (217 ft)
- Highest elevation: 77 m (253 ft)
- Lowest elevation: 0 m (0 ft)
- Population (2023): 471
  - Density: 70.9/km^{2} (184/sq mi)
- Time zone: UTC+01:00 (CET)
  - Summer (DST): UTC+02:00 (CEST)
- INSEE/Postal code: 14172 /14520
- ^{1} French Land Register data, which excludes lakes, ponds, glaciers > 1 km^{2} (0.386 sq mi or 247 acres) and river estuaries.

Commes (French pronunciation: [kɔm]) is a commune in the Calvados department in the Normandy region in northwestern France.

== Geography ==
Apart from the main village the commune includes the hamlets of Le Vignet, Le Boufflay, Hameau Le Bauqerie, Hameau Le Bosq, Hameau Les Monts, Le Grand Herbelet, Le Motée, Les Brousailles', La Chenevière and Escures.

== Population ==
Historical population
Year	Pop.	±% p.a.
1968	324	—
1975	278	−2.16%
1982	360	+3.76%
1990	382	+0.74%
1999	397	+0.43%
2007	410	+0.40%
2012	381	−1.46%
2017	401	+1.03%
2023	471	+2.72%
Source: INSEE

== See also ==
- Communes of the Calvados department
