= Bessin =

Area in Normandy

Coordinates: 49.3333°N 0.616667°W

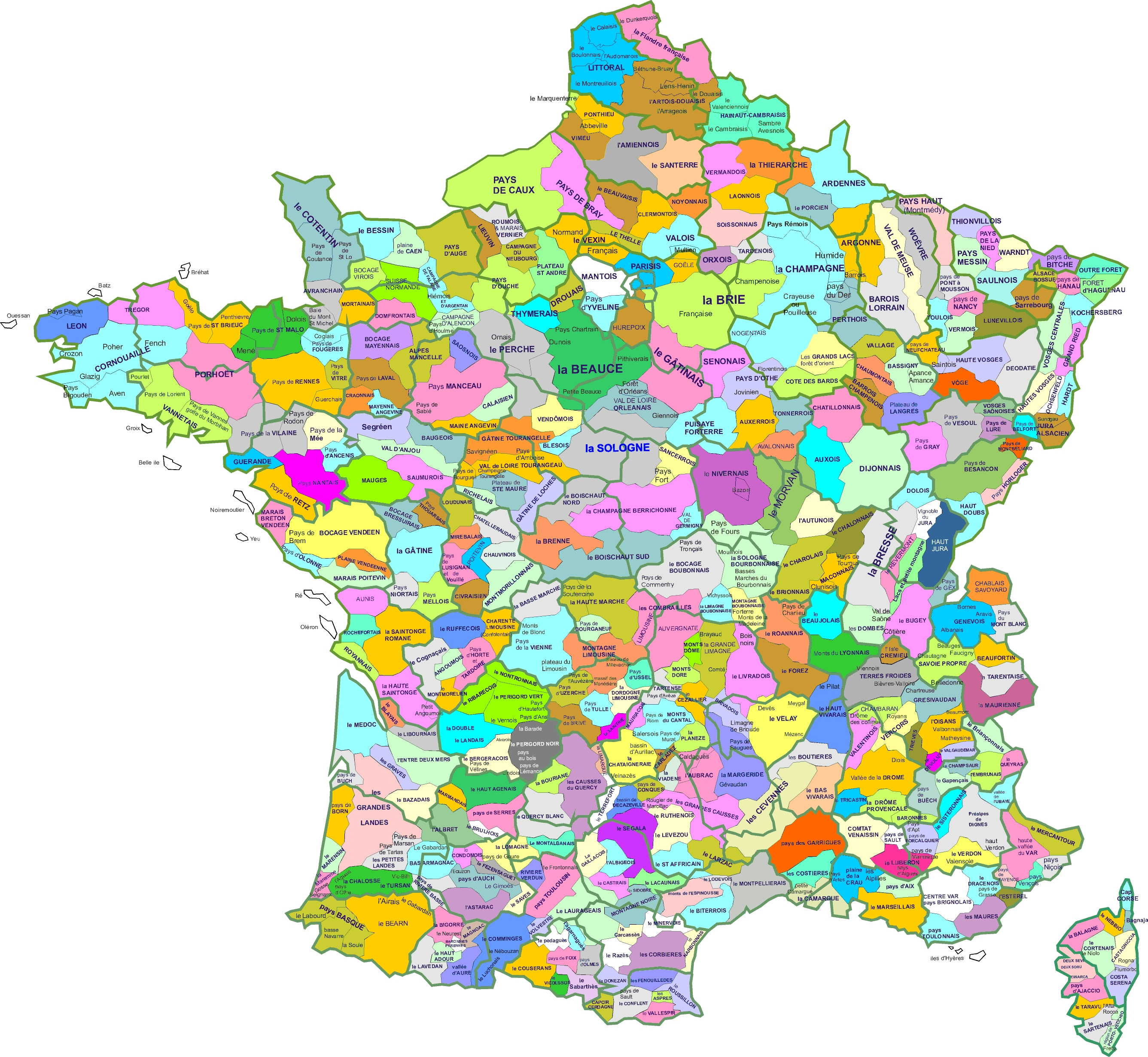
Location of Bessin in Normandy

Bessin (French pronunciation: [bɛsɛ̃]) is an area in Normandy, France, corresponding to the territory of the Bajocasses, a Gallic tribe from whom Bayeux, its main town, takes its name.

== History ==
The territory was annexed by the count of Rouen in 924.

The Bessin corresponds to the former diocese of Bayeux, which was incorporated into the Calvados département following the French Revolution.

The Littry coal mines supplying the lime kilns and the development of the road network allowed the growth of agricultural activity in Bessin in the first half of the 19th century.

== Ecology ==
Part of the Bessin is now administered as a national park for its importance as marshland.
