= Lavabo =

Device that provides water for handwashing

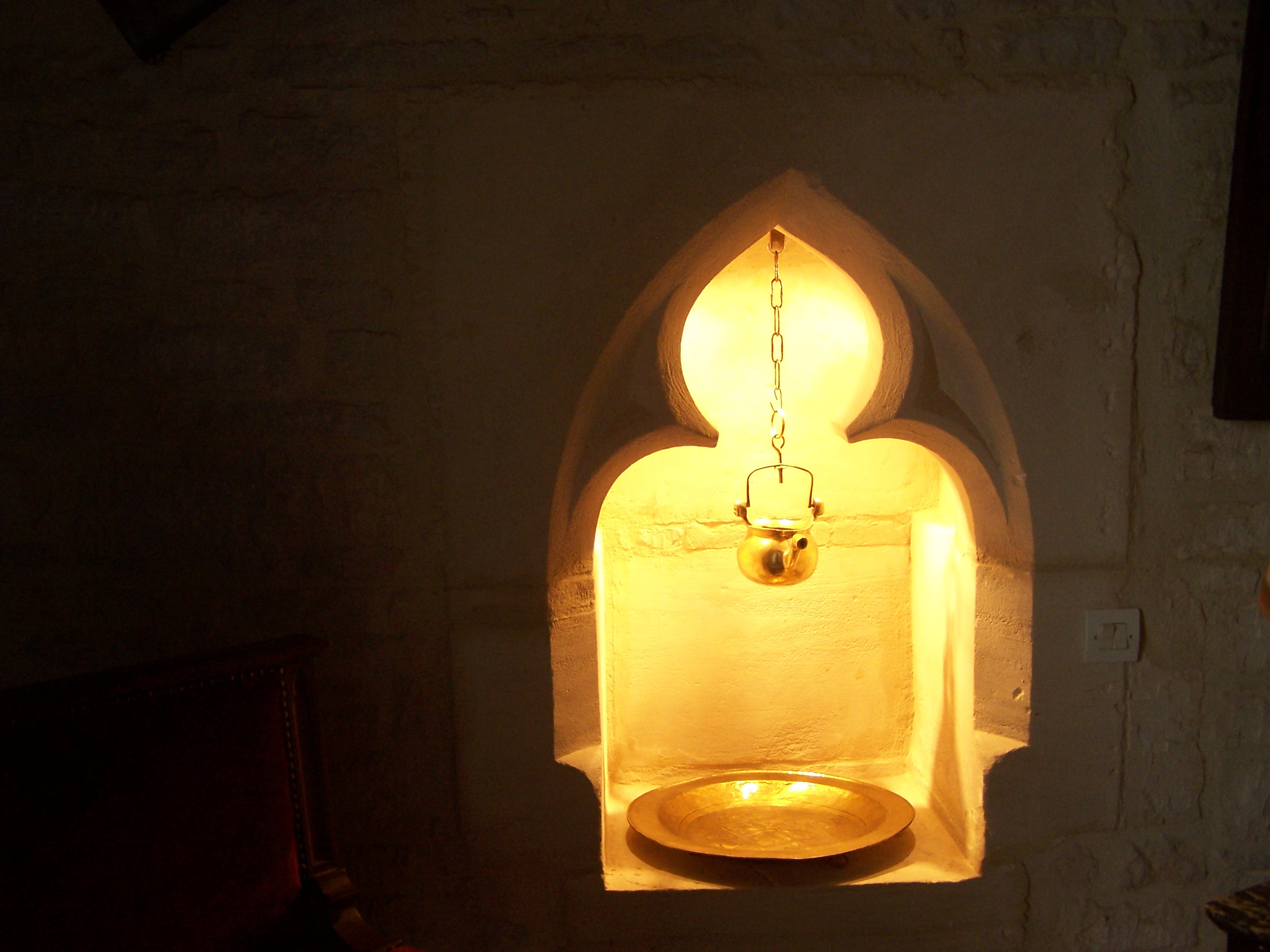
A 14th-century lavabo as a niche recessed into the side wall of a sanctuary in Amblie, Normandy

A lavabo is a device used to provide water for the washing of hands. It consists normally of a ewer or container of some kind to pour water, and a bowl to catch the water as it falls off the hands. In ecclesiastical usage it refers to all of: the basin in which the priest washes their hands; the ritual that surrounds this action in the Catholic Mass; and the architectural feature or fitting where a basin or place for one is recessed into the side wall of the sanctuary, or projects from it. If this last includes or included a drain, it is a piscina used for washing the church plate and other fittings, though the terms are often confused. In secular usage, it is an obsolete term for any sink or basin for washing hands, especially in a lavatory.

== Ablutions before Christian prayer and worship ==
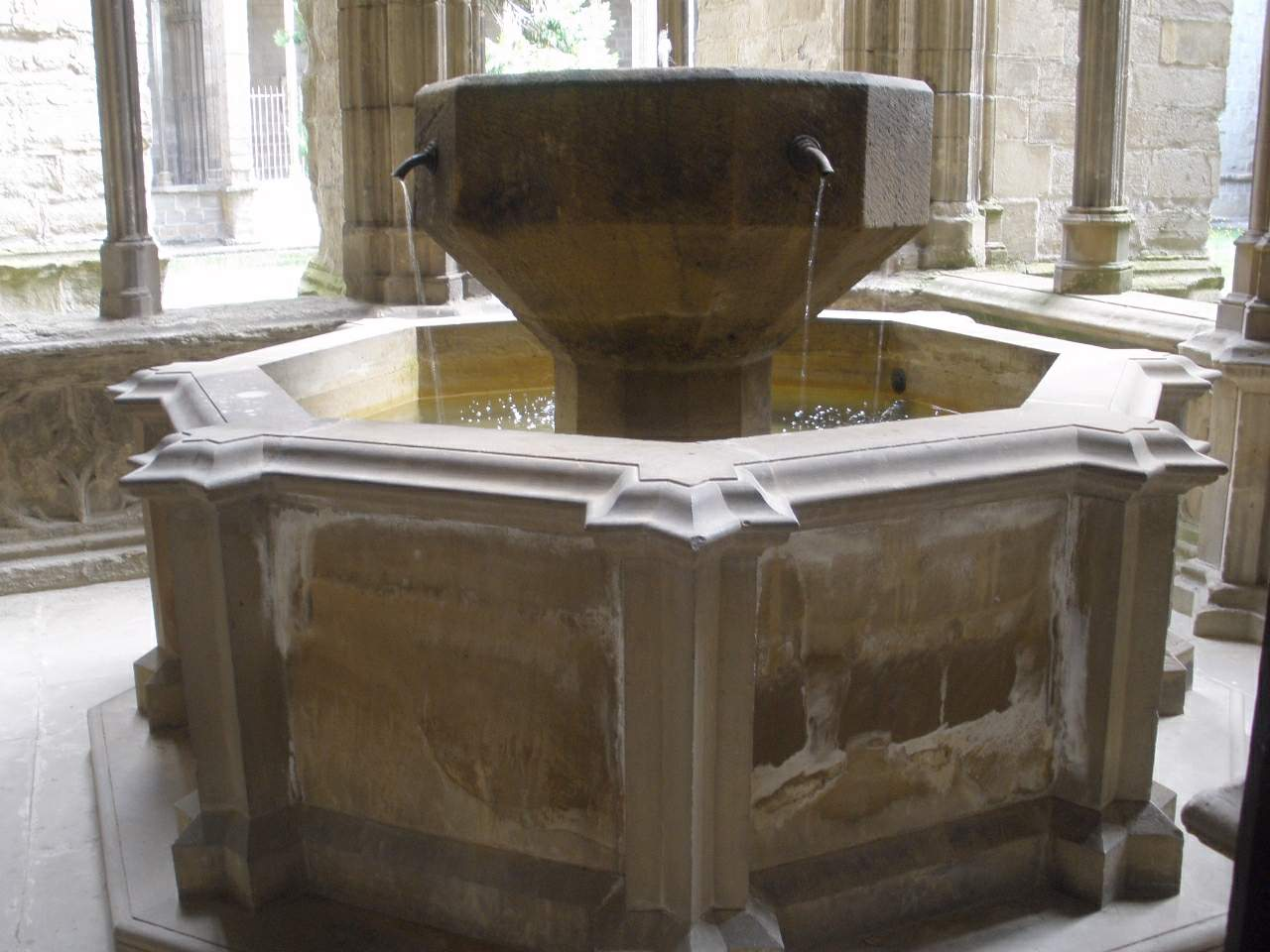
Cantharus of Pamplona Cathedral in Spain

Churches from the time of Constantine the Great were built with an exonarthex that included a fountain known as a cantharus, where Christians would wash their hands, face and feet before entering the worship space. The practice of ablutions before prayer and worship in Christianity symbolizes "separation from sins of the spirit and surrender to the Lord." Canthari continue to be used in some Orthodox churches, where worshippers also remove their shoes before entering into the presence of God.

In many early and medieval monasteries, there would be a large lavabo (lavatorio) where the brethren would wash their hands before entering the church. St. John Chrysostom mentions the custom in his day of all Christians washing their hands before entering the church for worship. This practice was first legislated in the Rule of St. Benedict in the 6th century, but has earlier antecedents.

== Ecclesiastical usage ==
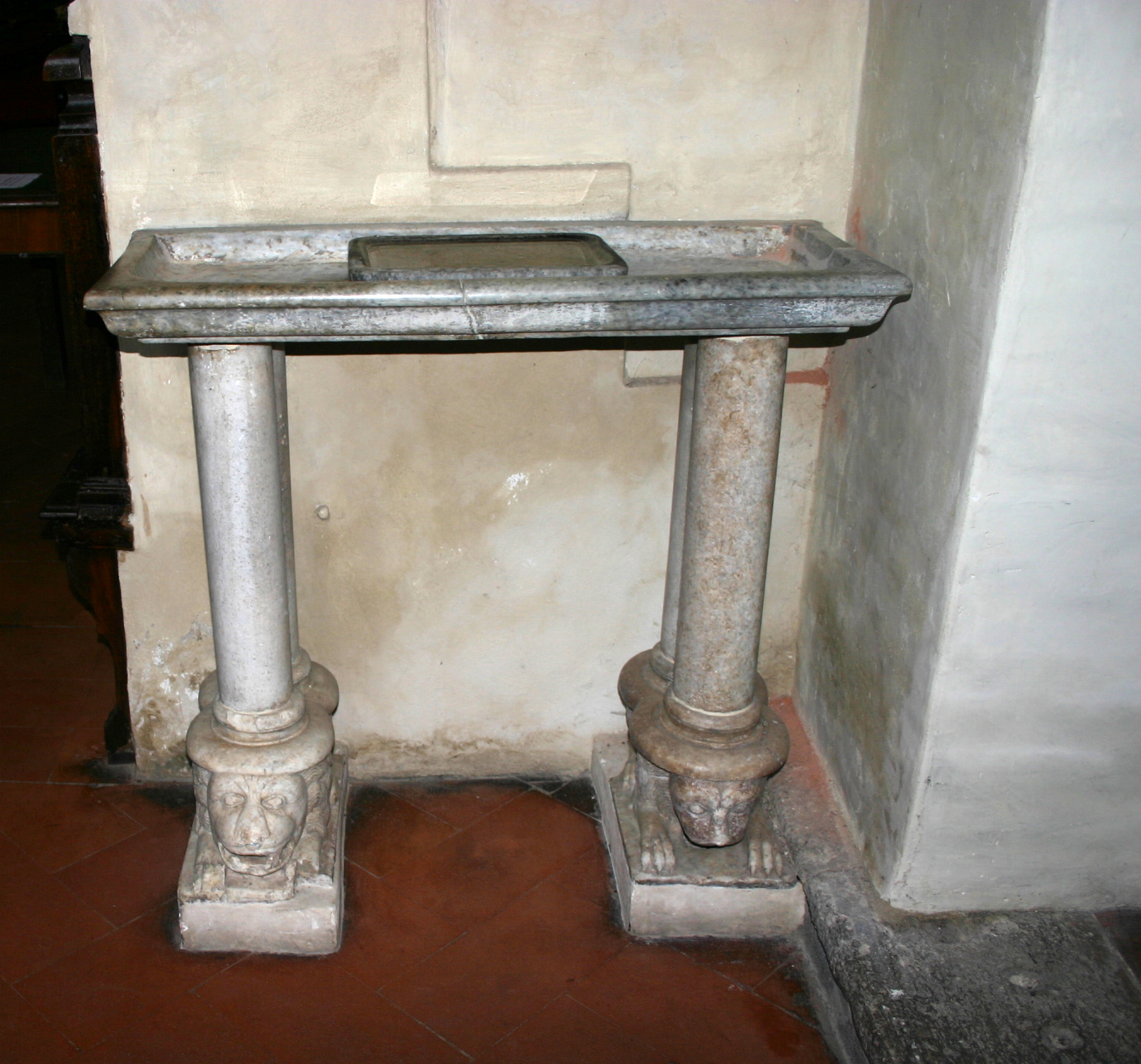
Mediaeval lavabo in the right-hand transept of Saint Mark's Church in Milan

The name lavabo ("I shall wash" in Latin) is derived from the words of Psalm 26:6–12 (KJV; in the Septuagint it is Psalm 25), which the celebrant traditionally recites while he washes his: "I will wash my hands in innocence, so will I compass thine altar, O Lord". The washing of hands during the recitation of these psalm verses is of very ancient usage in the Catholic Church:

In the third century there are traces of a custom of washing the hands as a preparation for prayer on the part of all Christians; and from the fourth century onwards it appears to have been usual for the ministers at the Communion Service [liturgy of the Eucharist] ceremonially to wash their hands before the more solemn part of the service as a symbol of inward purity.

In most liturgical traditions, the priest washes his hands after vesting, before the beginning of the liturgy. This washing may be accompanied by prayers. Many Christian rites also have the priest wash his hands before beginning the Eucharistic prayer. In the Apostolic Constitutions, VIII, 11, the hands of the celebrants are washed just before the dismissal of the catechumens.

=== Western Rite ===
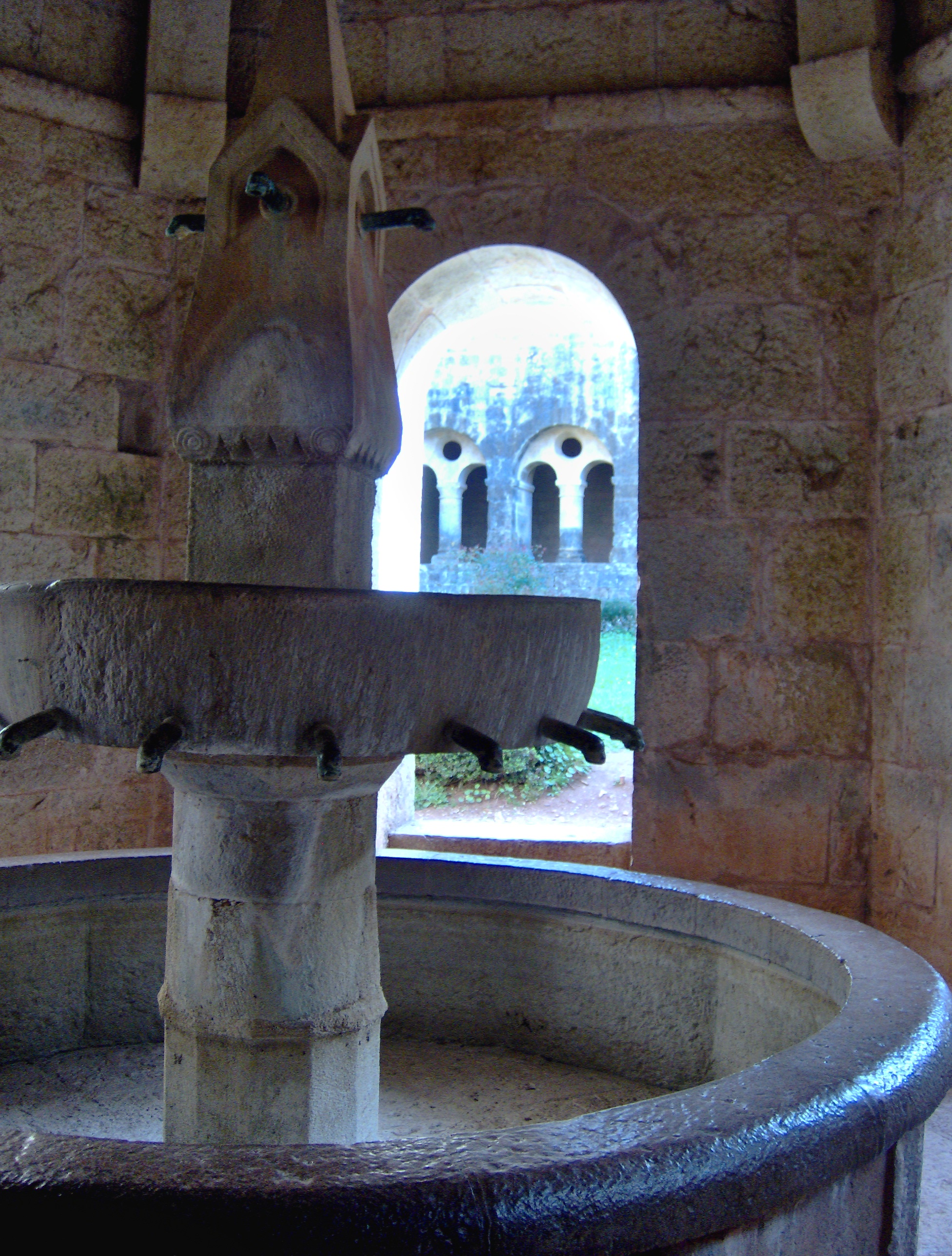
Lavabo, Le Thoronet Abbey, Le Thoronet, France

In the Roman Rite, the celebrant washes his hands privately before vesting for Mass, perhaps using the prayer (Da, Domine, virtutem). Within the rite of Mass he washes his hands after preparing the offerings on the altar. This is the lavabo ceremony proper. It appears in both the Tridentine and the post-Vatican II forms of the Roman Rite Mass. It probably developed from the need to wash the hands after receiving the gifts brought by the people at the offertory as was used at Rome. In the Gallican Rite the offerings were prepared before Mass began, as in the Eastern Liturgy of Preparation, so in those rites there was no long offertory rite nor need for a lavabo before the Eucharistic Prayer. In the Middle Ages, the Roman Rite actually had two washings of hands, one before and one after the offertory. The first one has since disappeared, and the one which remains is the second.

At High Mass (or sung Mass), in the older rite, and in the more solemn forms available in the newer version, after the offertory, the celebrant incenses the altar and is then incensed himself at the Epistle side (south side of the altar), he remains there while his hands are washed by the acolytes, who ought to be waiting by the credence table. The first acolyte pours water from the cruet over his fingers into a little dish, the second then hands him the towel to dry the fingers. Meanwhile, in the 1962 rubrics he says the psalm verses: "I will wash my hands among the innocent...", to the end of the psalm (Psalm 25: 6-12 in the Vulgate, which is Psalm 26: 6-12 in the Hebrew). In the newer Mass the celebrant says the prayer: "Lord, wash away my iniquity and cleanse me from my sin" (Psalm 50:2, Psalm 51:2 in the Hebrew).

A bishop at high Mass wears the "precious" mitre (mitra pretiosa) while he is censed and then washes his hands. A larger silver basin and cruet are generally used for a bishop, though there is no official requirement for this.

For the lavabo, the priest will use a simple linen towel, which is often considered to be one of the altar linens, though technically it is not.

=== Eastern Rites ===
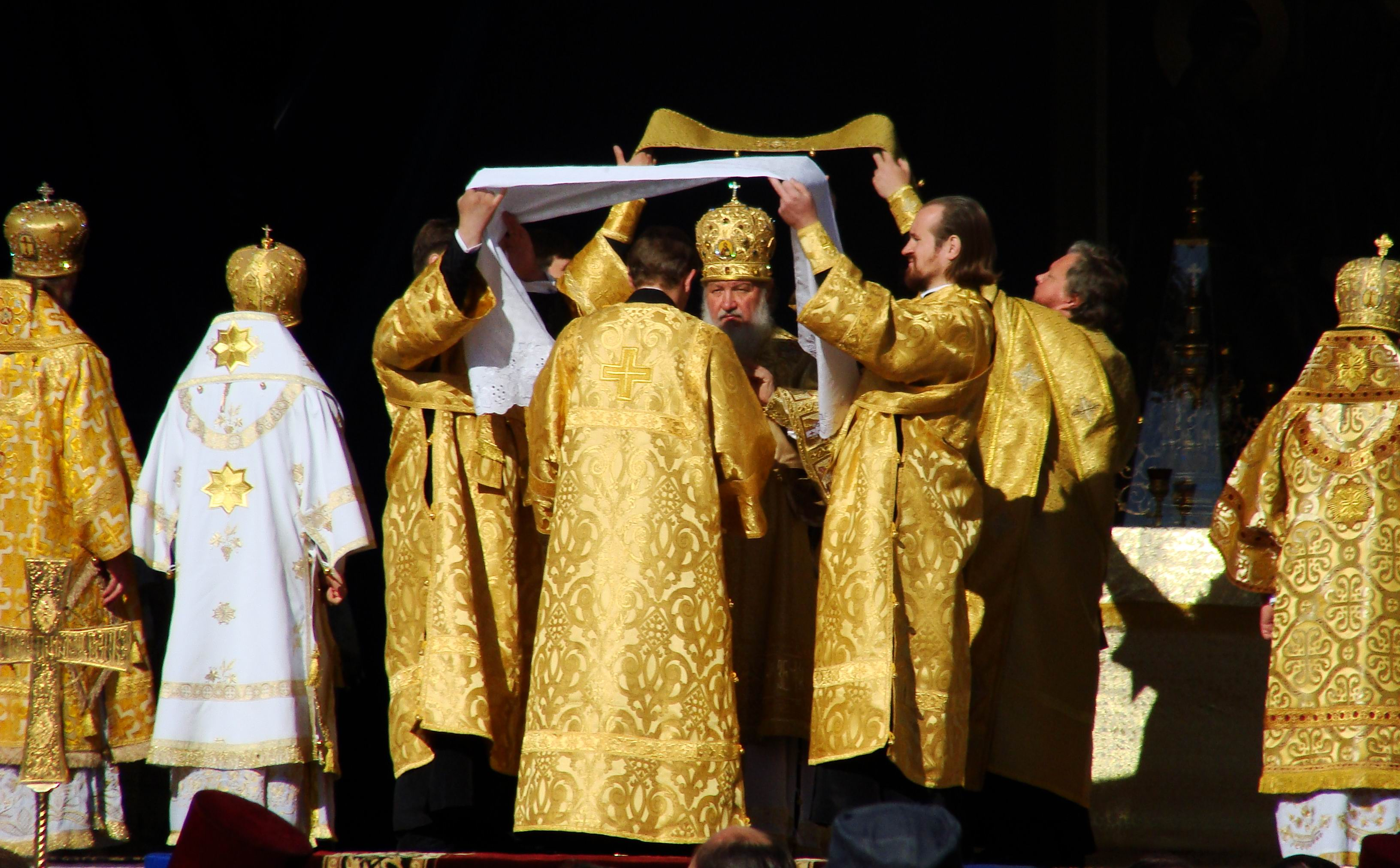
Patriarch Kirill I of Moscow washing his hands at the Great Entrance during an outdoor Divine Liturgy

In the Eastern Orthodox and Eastern Catholic Churches, the priest says the last six verses from Psalm 26:

I will wash my hands in innocence and I will compass Thine altar, O Lord, that I may hear the voice of Thy praise and tell of all Thy wondrous works. O Lord, I have loved the beauty of Thy house, and the place where Thy glory dwelleth. Destroy not my soul with the ungodly, nor my life with men of blood, in whose hands are iniquities; their right hand is full of bribes. But as for me, in mine innocence have I walked; redeem me, O Lord, and have mercy on me. My foot hath stood in uprightness; in the congregations will I bless Thee, O Lord.

After vesting, he goes to the thalassidion (piscina) to wash his hands before approaching the prothesis (altar of preparation), where he will prepare the bread and wine for the Divine Liturgy. This lavabo takes place quietly, outside of the view of the congregation.

Saint Cyril of Jerusalem mentions a washing of hands that takes place in the sight of the people (Mystagogical Catechism, v). And this still takes place at a Hierarchical Divine Liturgy (i.e., one at which a bishop is serving). He will wash his hands as he stands at the kathedra in the nave of the church. This takes place during the reading of the Little Hours after he has been solemnly vested by two subdeacons. The subdeacons and a server will approach the bishop; the server holds the ewer and basin, and has a large towel around his neck. The subedacons pour rose water over the bishop's hands and then lift the towel from the server's neck and give it to the bishop for him to dry his hands. Meanwhile, the protodeacon is swinging the censer and chanting the verses from Psalm 25. Afterwards, the subdeacons replace the towel over the server's neck, and all three bow to the bishop and return to the sanctuary.

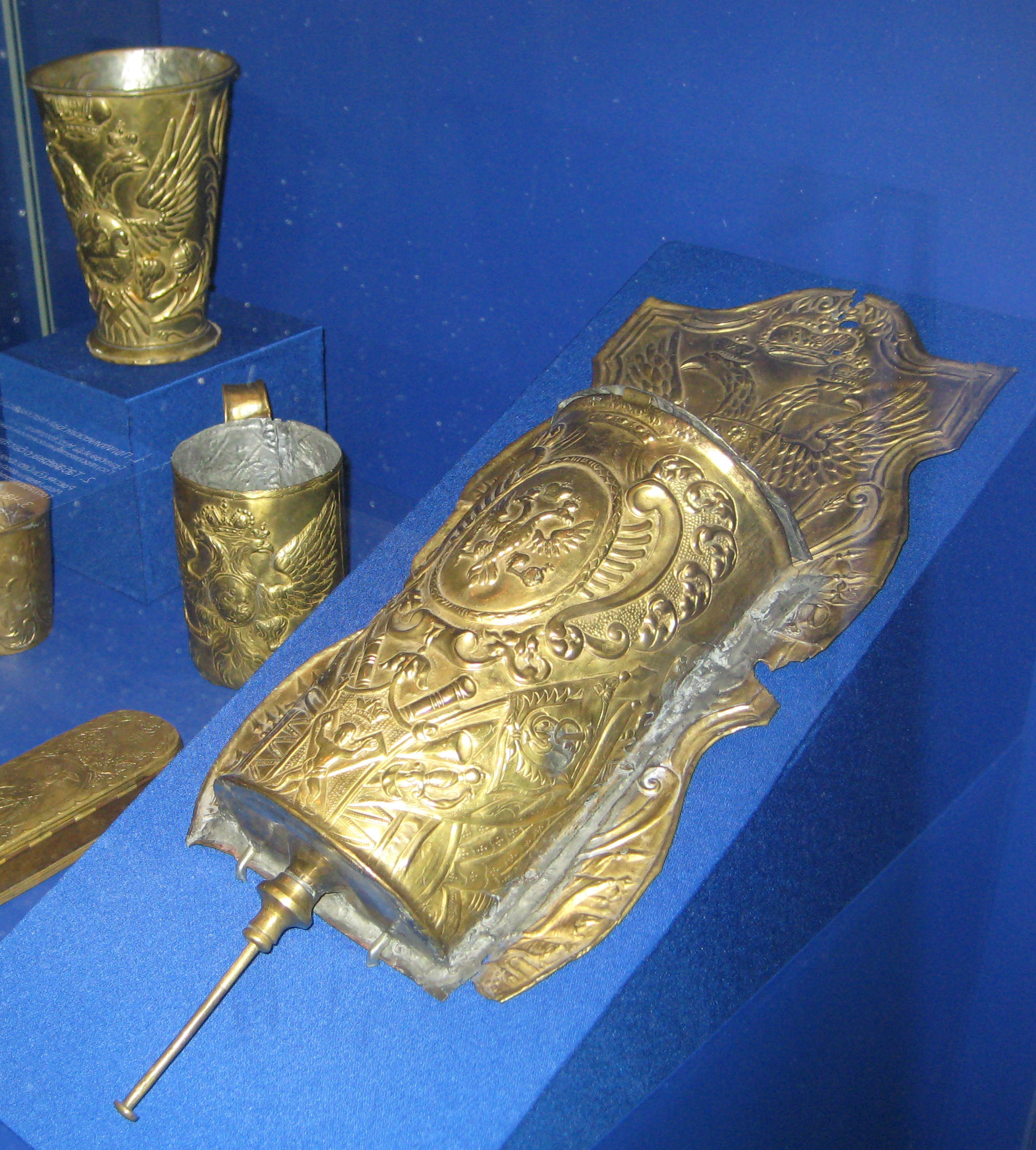
An 18th-century brass lavabo used in the Russian army

Just before the Great Entrance the same ceremony takes place as during the Little Hours, except now it takes place in front of the Holy Doors of the iconostasis. After drying his hands, the bishop goes to the prothesis to make his personal commemorations for the living and the dead, as he removes particles from the prosphora.

The clergy will also wash their hands after receiving Holy Communion, but this is not accompanied by special prayers.

In the Syriac and Coptic rites, the lavabo takes place after the recitation of the Nicene Creed.

== Secular usage ==
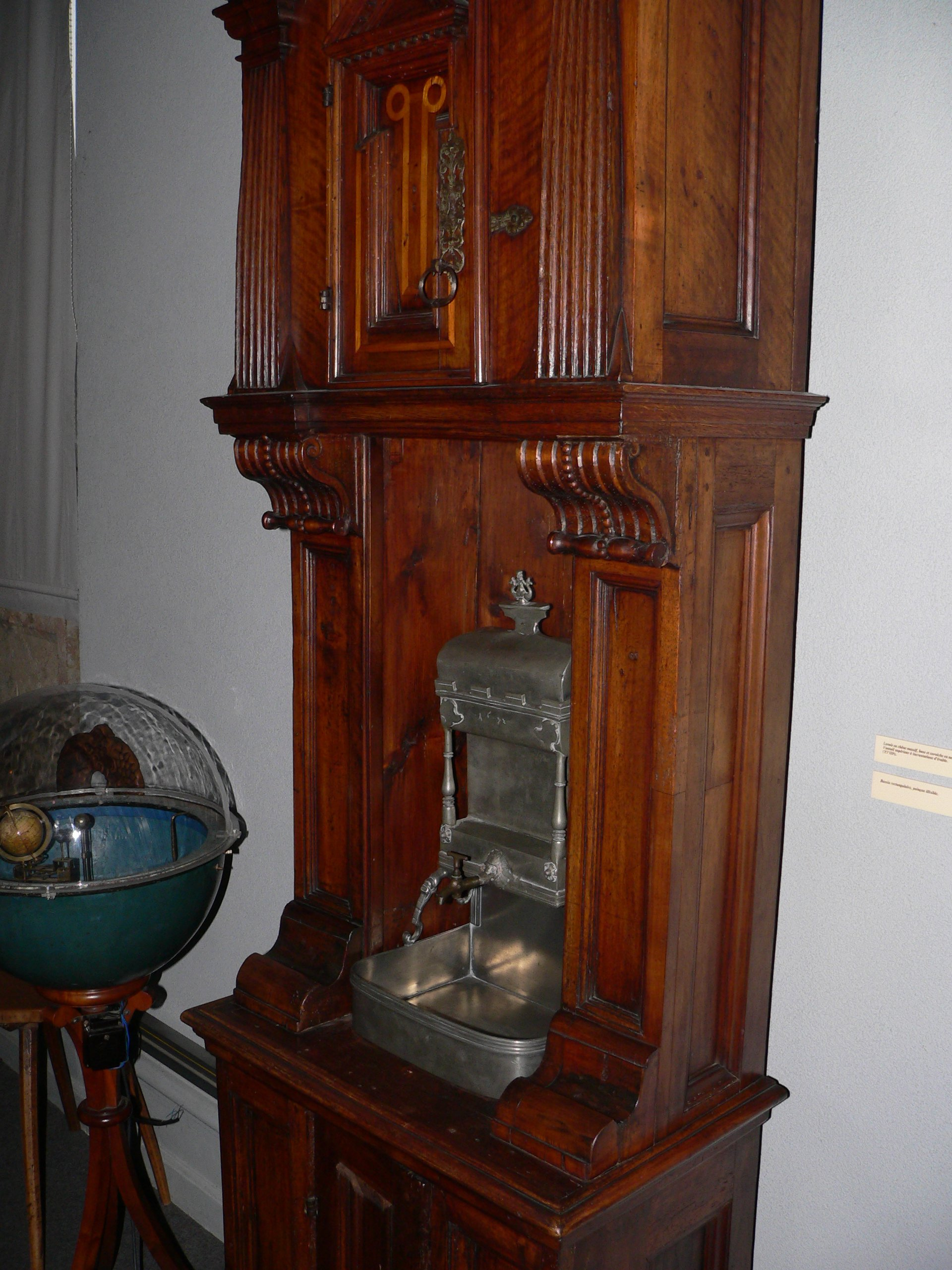
A 19th-century lavabo

Though ecclesiastical lavabos are ordinarily of metal, a familiar lavabo consists of a terra cotta tank with a faucet attached and a small basin below it. Today it is a common feature in many gardens in Europe and the U.S. as a decoration whose practical use has been long forgotten.

The lavabo may be considered the forerunner of the modern sink. In several European languages (French, Italian, Serbo-Croatian, Spanish, Turkish), lavabo is the modern word for sink or washbasin.

== See also ==
- Aquamanile
- Ablution in Christianity
