= Hygiene in Christianity =

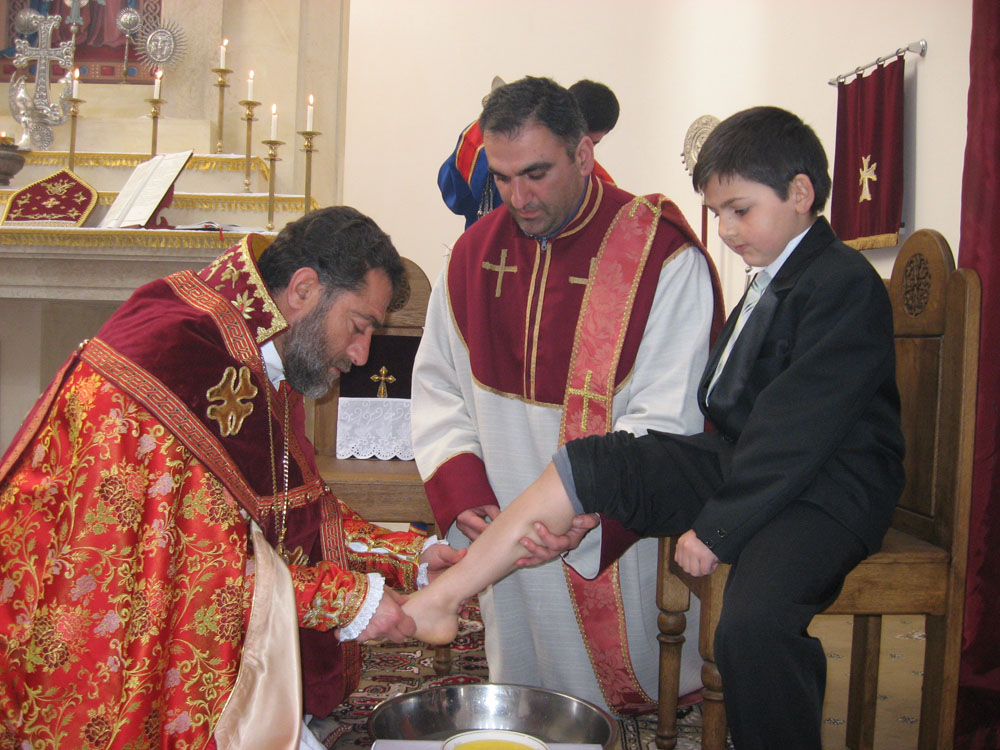
Bishop Sebouh Chouldjian of the Armenian Apostolic Church washing the feet of children

In some denominations of Christianity, there are a number of regulations involving cleanliness before prayer, observing days of ritual purification, as well as those concerning diet and apparel. The Bible has many rituals of purification in areas ranging from the mundane private rituals of personal hygiene and toilet etiquette to the complex public rituals of social etiquette.

Certain Christian rules of purity have implications for bodily hygiene and observing cleanliness, including sexual hygiene, menstruation and toilet etiquette. In the Coptic Orthodox Church, the Ethiopian Orthodox Church and the Eritrean Orthodox Tewahedo Church male circumcision is an established practice. Around the time of Tertullian, an early Church Father, it was customary for Christians to wash their hands (manulavium), face (capitilavium) and feet (pedilavium) before prayer, as well as before receiving Holy Communion. The rite of footwashing employed a basin of water and linen towels, done in the imitation of Christ.

Christianity has always placed a strong emphasis on hygiene, and water plays a role in the Christian rituals. The Church also built public bathing facilities that were separate for both sexes near monasteries and pilgrimage sites; also, the Catholic popes situated baths within church basilicas and monasteries since the Early Middle Ages. Public bathhouses were common in medieval Christendom larger towns and cities such as Constantinople, Rome, Paris, Regensburg and Naples.

Many Christian monastic communities throughout history have emphasized cleanliness and hygiene as part of their spiritual practice. Protestant Christianity also played a prominent role in the development of the spas in Northern Europe. A major contribution of the Christian missionaries in Africa, Asia and other places was better health care through hygiene and the introduction and distribution of soaps.

== Bible ==
The Bible has many rituals of purification in areas ranging from the mundane private rituals of personal hygiene and toilet etiquette to the complex public rituals of social etiquette. The Bible also has many rituals of purification relating to menstruation, childbirth, sexual relations, nocturnal emission, unusual bodily fluids, skin disease, death, and animal sacrifices. In the Old Testament, ablution was considered a prerequisite to approaching God, whether by means of sacrifice, prayer, or entering a holy place.

=== Old Testament ===
The Old Testament requires immersion of the body in water as a means of purification in several circumstances, for example:

And when the zav is cleansed of his issue, then he shall number to himself seven days for his cleansing, and wash his clothes; and he shall bathe his flesh in running water, and shall be clean.

There are also references to hand-washing:

And whoever the zav touches, without having rinsed his hands in water, he shall wash his clothes, and bathe himself in water, and be unclean until the evening.

I will wash my hands in innocency; so will I compass Thine altar, O LORD.

Priests were required to wash their hands and feet before service in the Temple:

Thou shalt also make a laver of brass, and the base thereof of brass, whereat to wash; and thou shalt put it between the tent of meeting and the altar, and thou shalt put water therein. And Aaron and his sons shall wash their hands and their feet thereat; when they go into the tent of meeting, they shall wash with water, that they die not; or when they come near to the altar to minister, to cause an offering made by fire to smoke unto the LORD.

==== Book of Leviticus ====
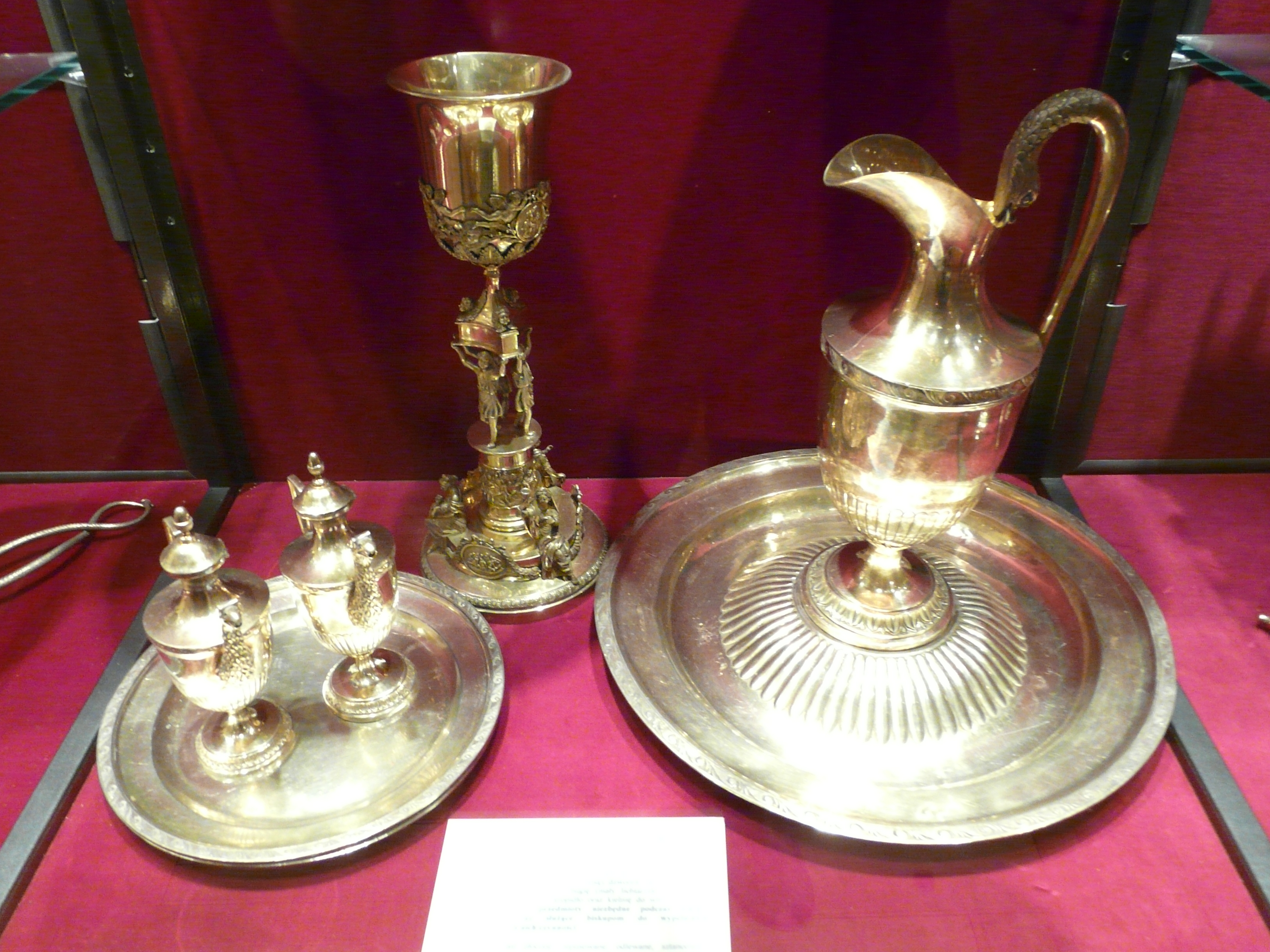
A silver cup and vessels used for hand-washing during the Mass

With sacrifice and priesthood established, chapters 11–15 in the Book of Leviticus instruct lay people on purity (or cleanliness). Eating certain animals produces uncleanliness, as does giving birth; certain skin diseases (but not all) are unclean, as are certain conditions affecting walls and clothing (mildew and similar conditions); and genital discharges, including female menses and male gonorrhea, are unclean. The reasoning behind the food rules are obscure; for the rest the guiding principle seems to be that all these conditions involve a loss of "life force", usually but not always blood.

Ritual purity is essential for an Israelite to be able to approach Yahweh and remain part of the community. Uncleanliness threatens holiness; chapters 11–15 review the various causes of uncleanliness and describe the rituals which will restore cleanliness. One is to maintain cleanliness through observation of the rules on sexual behaviour, family relations, land ownership, worship, sacrifice, and observance of holy days.

Yahweh dwells with Israel in the Holy of Holies. All of the priestly ritual focuses on Yahweh and the construction and maintenance of a holy space, but sin generates impurity, as do everyday events such as childbirth and menstruation; impurity thus pollutes the holy dwelling place. Failure to purify the sacred space ritually could result in God's leaving, which would be disastrous.

=== New Testament ===
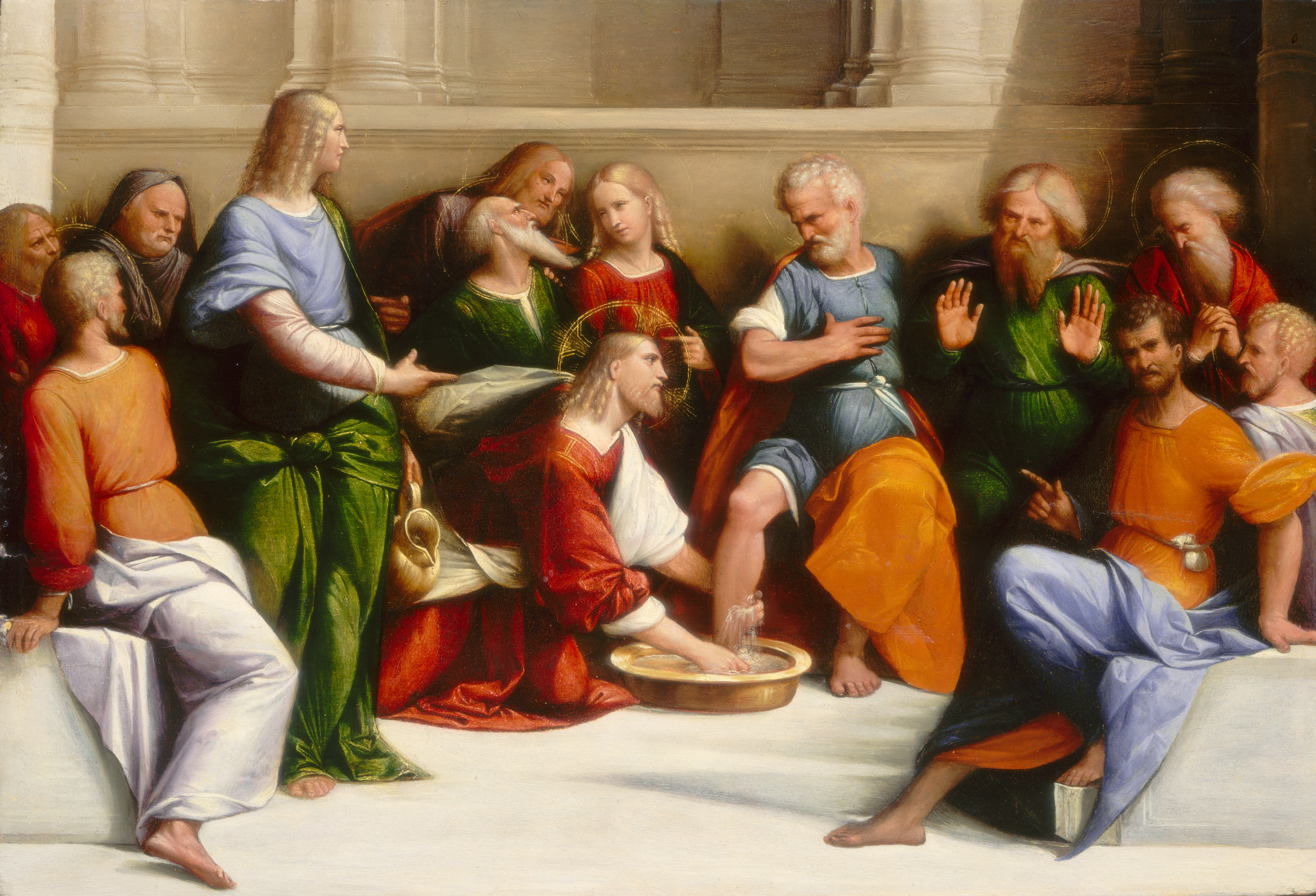
Christ washing the Disciples' feet, by Benvenuto Tisi

In the New Testament, washing also occurs in reference to rites of Judaism part of the action of a healing by Jesus, the preparation of a body for burial, the washing of nets by fishermen, a person's personal washing of the face to appear in public, the cleansing of an injured person's wounds, Pontius Pilate's washing of his hands as a symbolic claim of innocence and foot washing, which is a rite within Christian churches. According to the Gospel of Matthew, Pontius Pilate declared himself innocent of the blood of Jesus by washing his hands. This act of Pilate may not, however, have been borrowed from the custom of the Jews. The same practice was common among the Greeks and Romans.

According to Christian tradition, the Pharisees carried the practice of ablution to great excess. The Gospel of Mark refers to their ceremonial ablutions: "For the Pharisees…wash their hands 'oft'" or, more accurately, "with the fist" (R.V., "diligently"); or, as Theophylact of Bulgaria explains it, "up to the elbow," referring to the actual word used in the Greek New Testament, πυγμή pygmē, which refers to the arm from the elbow to the tips of the fingers. In the Book of Acts, Paul and other men performed ablution before entering the Temple in Jerusalem: "Then Paul took the men, and the next day purifying himself with them entered into the temple, to signify the accomplishment of the days of purification, until that an offering should be offered for every one of them."

== History ==
=== Early Christianity ===
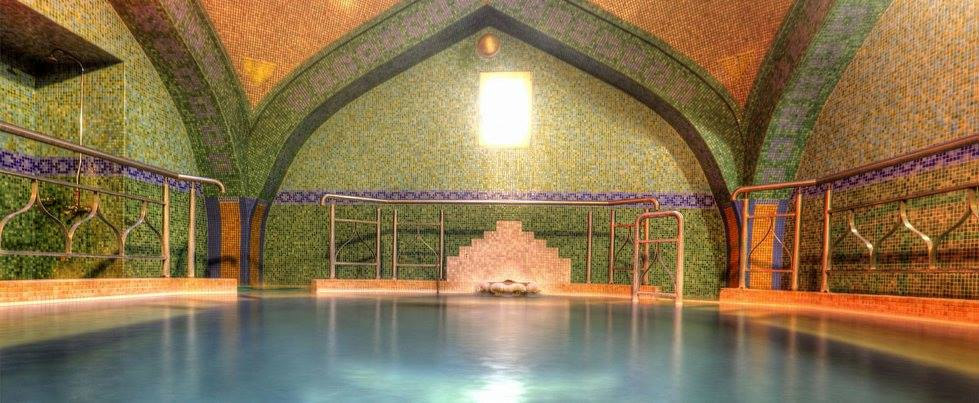
Agkistro Byzantine bath

Christianity has always placed a strong emphasis on hygiene, and water plays a role in the Christian rituals. Early Christian clergy condemned the practice of mixed bathing as practiced by the Romans, such as the pagan custom of women naked bathing in front of men; as such, the Didascalia Apostolorum, an early Christian manual, enjoined Christians to bathe themselves in those facilities that were separated by sex, which contributed to hygiene and good health according to the Church Fathers, such as Clement of Alexandria and Tertullian.

The Church also built public bathing facilities that were separate for both sexes near monasteries and pilgrimage sites; also, the popes situated baths within church basilicas and monasteries since the Early Middle Ages. Pope Gregory the Great urged his followers on the value of bathing as a bodily need. Around the time of Tertullian, an early Church Father, it was customary for Christians to wash their hands (manulavium), face (capitilavium) and feet (pedilavium) before prayer, as well as before receiving Holy Communion. The rite of footwashing employed a basin of water and linen towels, done in the imitation of Christ.

=== Middle Ages ===
==== Eastern Christendom ====
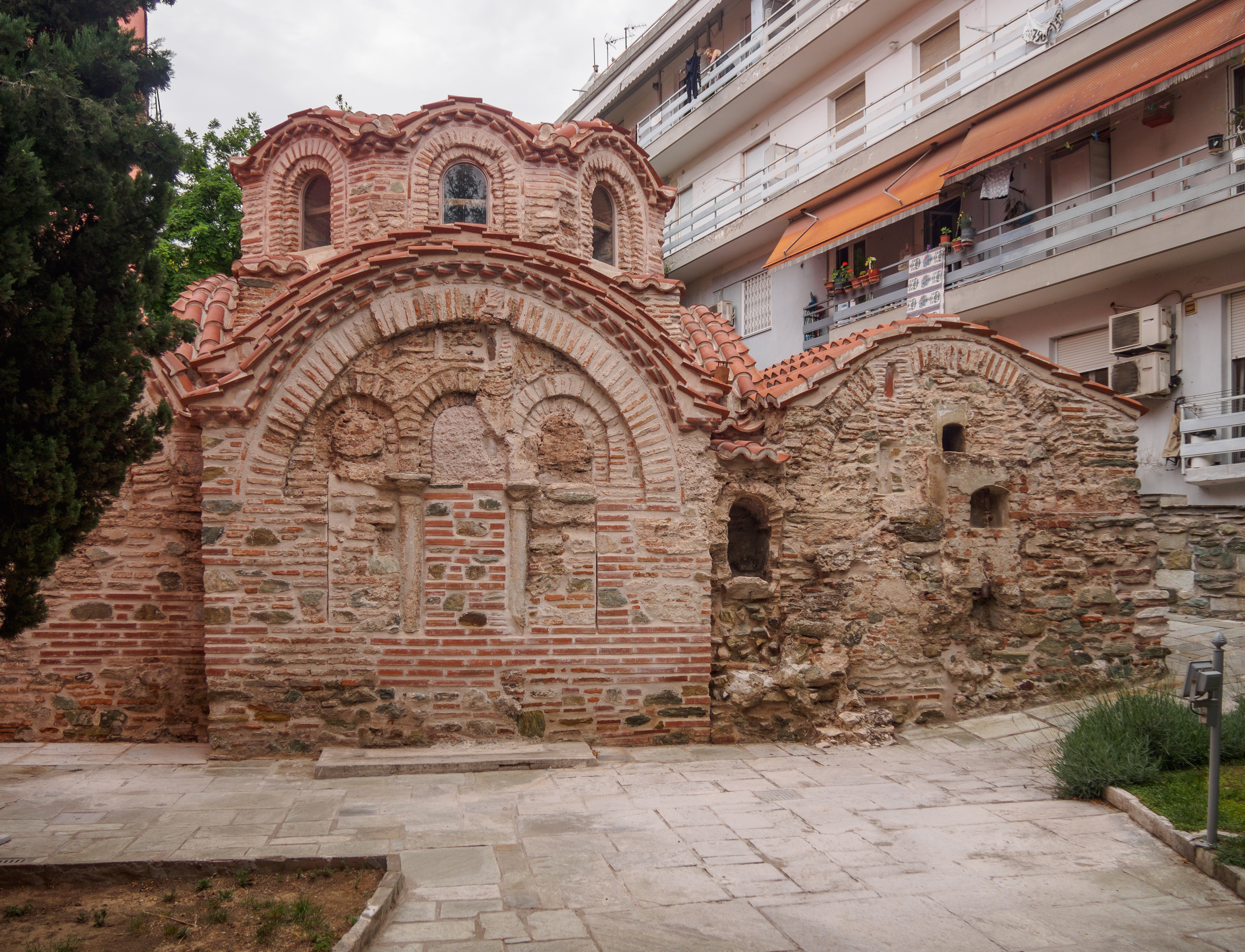
Byzantine Bath in Thessaloniki

Great bathhouses were built in Byzantine centers such as Constantinople and Antioch. Constantinople offered numerous bathhouses to its citizens, but the Baths of Zeuxippus were particularly popular, even monks and members of the clergy could be seen there. For a relatively small fee, any member of the public could gain admission to the bath complex. The Baths of Zeuxippus were also close (most probably adjacent) to the Great Palace grounds. This suggests their great popularity, since such a significant location would have attracted many people. The Baths were also close to the square of the Augustaeum and the basilica of Hagia Sophia.

Although Byzantine bathhouses were primarily used for public bathing, people could also exercise and enjoy a variety of recreational activities there. Attendants were paid to oversee the activities, enforcing opening and closing times and the rules of conduct. Men and women were not allowed to bathe together; they would either use separate baths, or bathe at different times of day.

The Byzantine Bath of the Upper Town was one of several in Thessaloniki —the 14th-century writer Nikephoros Choumnos claims that Thessaloniki had more baths than inhabitants—but is the only surviving in Thessaloniki and the largest and most complete of the Byzantine baths surviving elsewhere in Greece: one in Agkistro, five ruined public baths—two in Corinth, one in Sparta, one in Paramythia, one in Ioannina Castle—and one each in the monasteries of Kaisariani and Zoodochos Pigi.

Believing that on the Feast of Epiphany water becomes holy and imbued with special powers, Eastern Orthodox cut holes in the ice of lakes and rivers, often in the shape of the cross, to bathe in the freezing water. Christianity strongly affected the development of holy wells in Europe and the Middle East, and its water are known for its healing properties.

==== Western Christendom ====
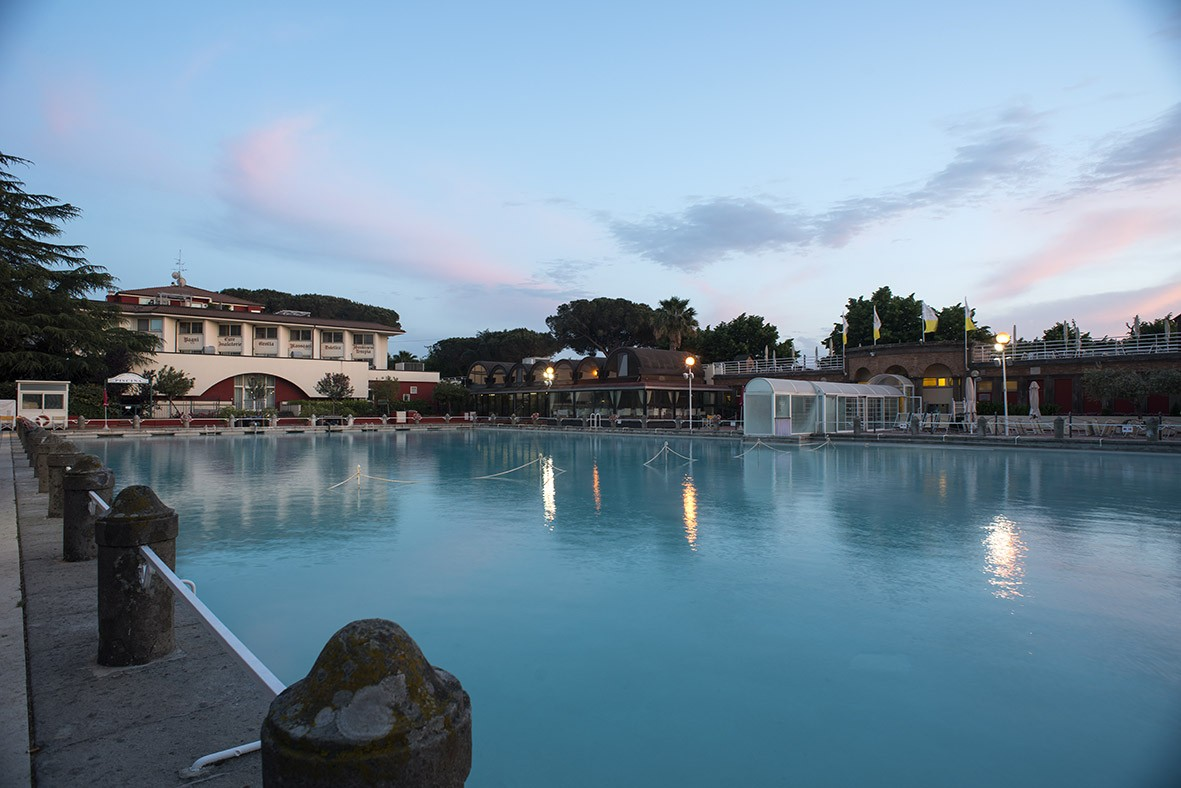
Bagno del Papa in Viterbo

The popes allocated to the Romans bathing through diaconia, or private Lateran baths, or even a myriad of monastic bath houses functioning in eighth and ninth centuries. The popes maintained their baths in their residences which described by scholar Paolo Squatriti as "luxurious baths", and bath houses including hot baths incorporated into Christian church buildings or those of monasteries, which known as "charity baths" because they served both the clerics and needy poor people.

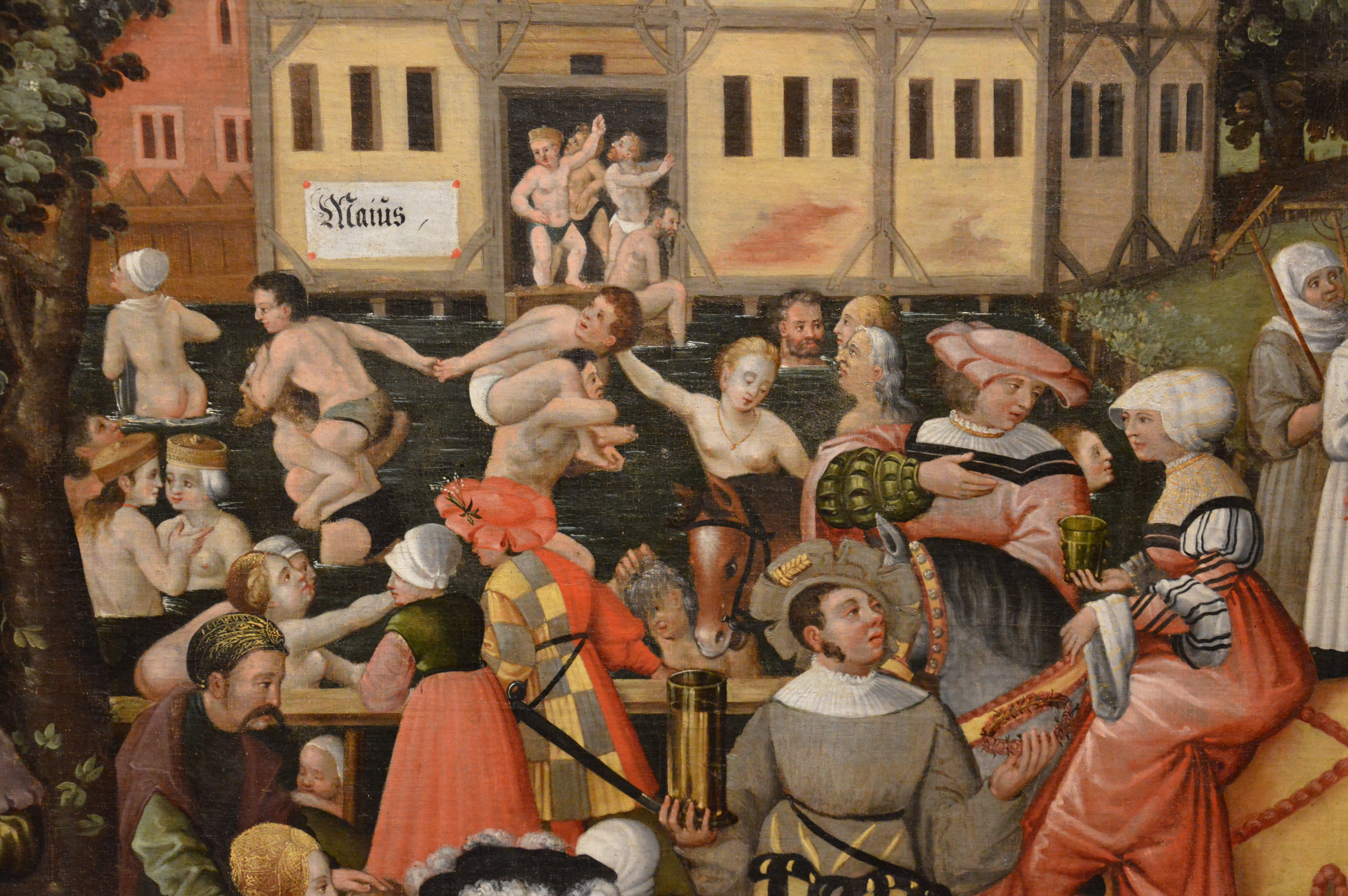
Public bathing in Augsburg, Germany, by Jörg Breu the Elder, c. 1531

Public bathhouses were common in medieval Christendom larger towns and cities such as Paris, Regensburg and Naples. There were about twenty-six public baths in Paris in 1272. Many Christian monastic communities throughout history have emphasized cleanliness and hygiene as part of their spiritual practice. Catholic religious orders of the Augustinians' and Benedictines' rules contained ritual purification, and inspired by Benedict of Nursia encouragement for the practice of therapeutic bathing; Benedictine monks played a role in the development and promotion of spas. Protestant Christianity also played a prominent role in the development of the British spas.

In c. 1454 Pope Nicholas V commissioned building a bath palace in Viterbo, and the construction at the Bagno del Papa was continued on through the reigns of several popes after Nicholas V. The Vatican accounts mention payments "for building done at the bath palace of Viterbo" during the reigns of Calixtus III, Paul II, and Sixtus IV. There also is evidence Pope Pius II was responsible for the addition of a western wing to the building.

Contrary to popular belief bathing and sanitation were not lost in Europe with the collapse of the Roman Empire. Soapmaking first became an established trade during the so-called "Dark Ages". The Romans used scented oils (mostly from Egypt), among other alternatives. By the 15th century, the manufacture of soap in Christendom had become virtually industrialized, with sources in Antwerp, Castile, Marseille, Naples and Venice. In the 17th century the Spanish Catholic manufacturers purchased the monopoly on Castile soap from the cash-strapped Carolinian government.

=== Modern period ===
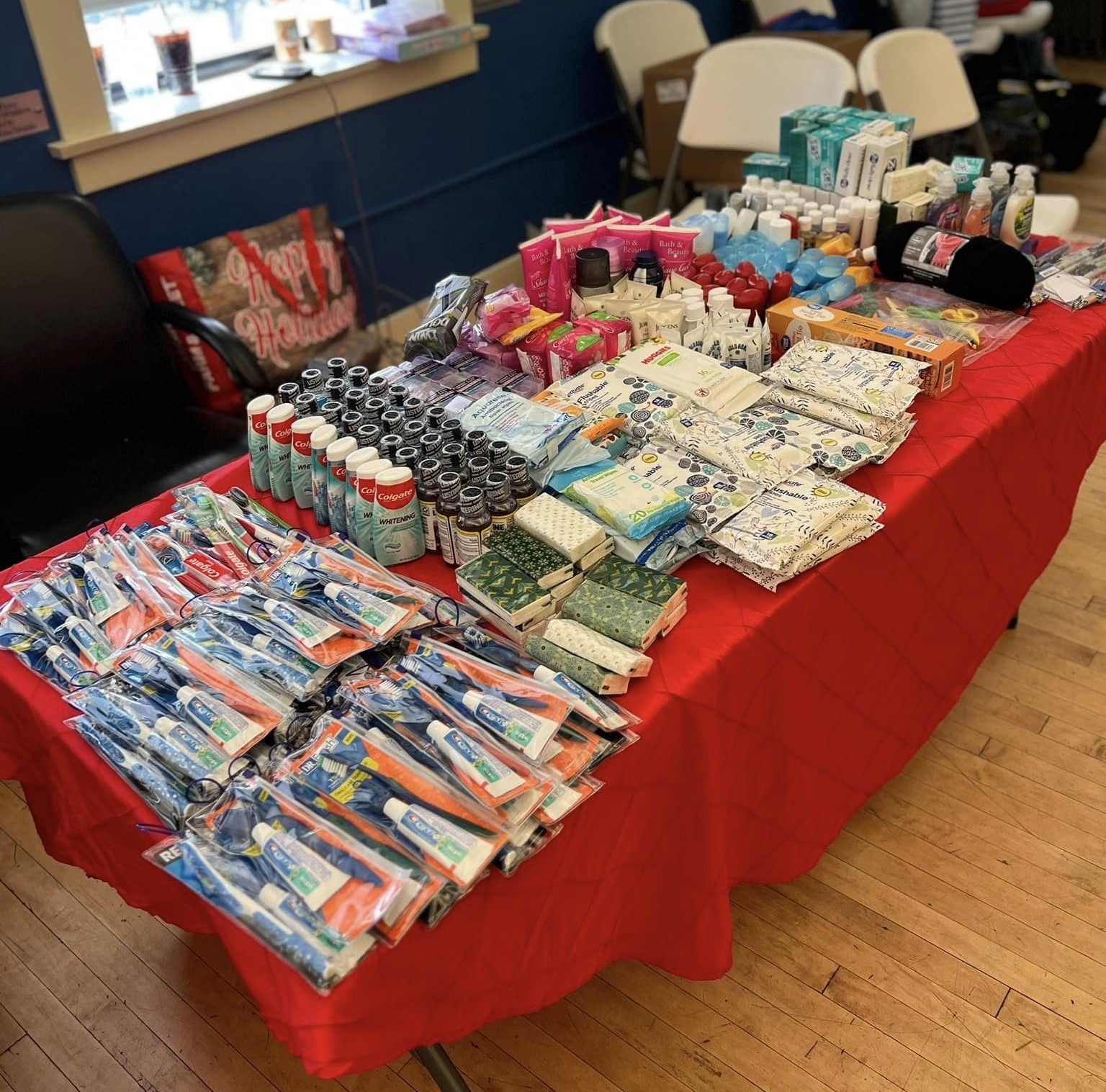
Collection of the Salvation Army personal hygiene kits

By the mid-19th century, the English urbanised middle classes had formed an ideology of cleanliness that ranked alongside typical Victorian concepts of moralism, such as Christianity, respectability and social progress. The Salvation Army has adopted the deployment of personal hygiene, and by providing personal hygiene products, such as a toothbrush, toothpaste, and soap.

The Seventh-day Adventist Church teach its adherents the importance of personal hygiene and sanitation, and emphasize the importance of drinking clean water, bathing and clean clothes. They were also encouraged to eat clean food. The Seventh-day Adventist Church in Africa and in other parts of the world promotes male infant circumcision.

A major contribution of the Christian missionaries in Africa, China, Guatemala, India, Indonesia, Korea, and other places was better health care of the people through hygiene and introducing and distributing the soaps, tooth–powder and brushes. According to scholar John Thomas "cleanliness and hygiene became an important marker of being identified as a Christian".

The use of water in many Christian countries is due in part to the biblical toilet etiquette, which encourages washing after all instances of defecation. The bidet is common in predominantly Catholic countries where water is considered essential for anal cleansing, and in some traditionally Orthodox and Lutheran countries, such as Greece and Finland, respectively, where bidet showers are common.

== Washing before Christian prayer and worship ==
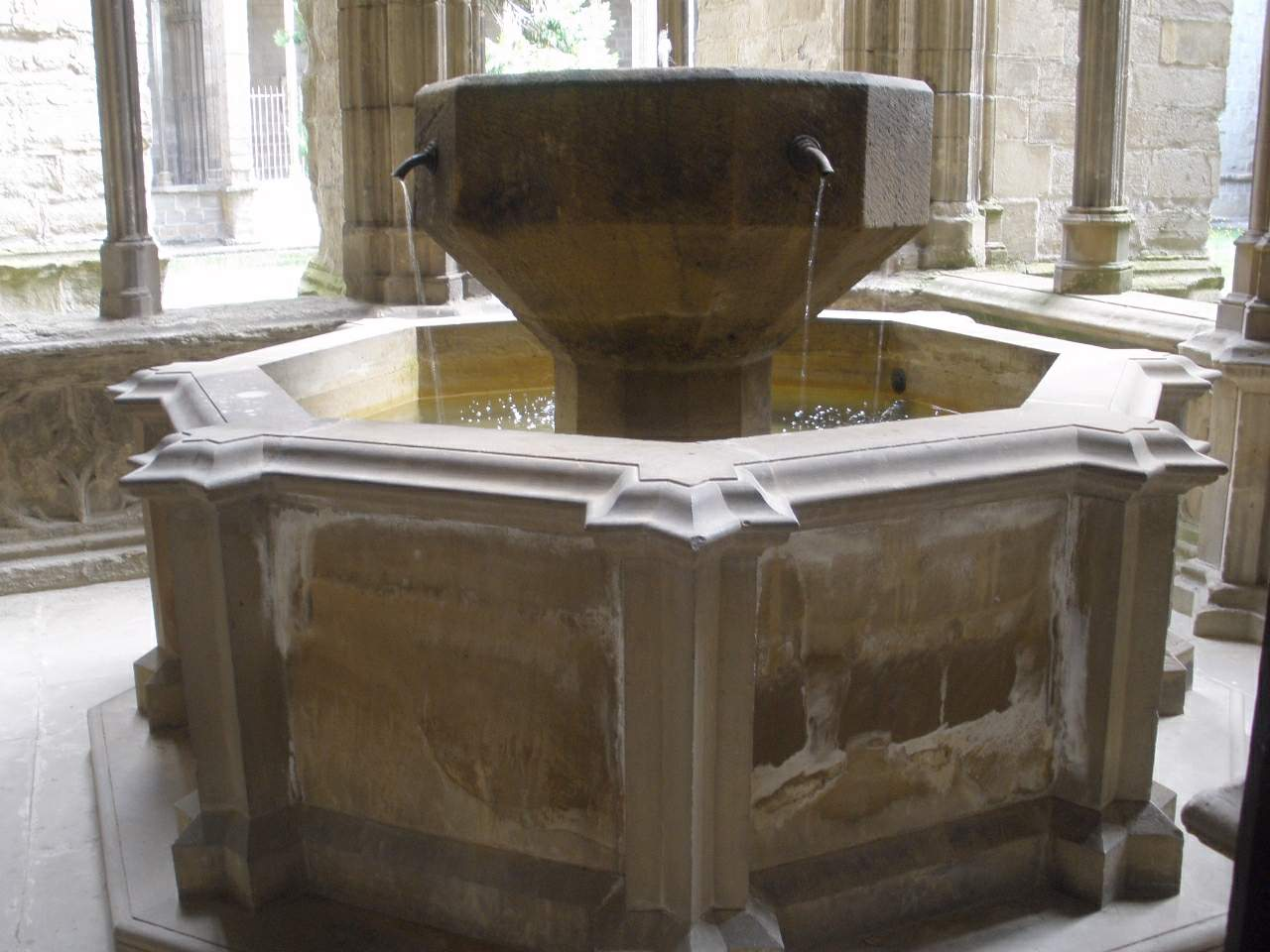
Cantharus of Pamplona Cathedral in Spain

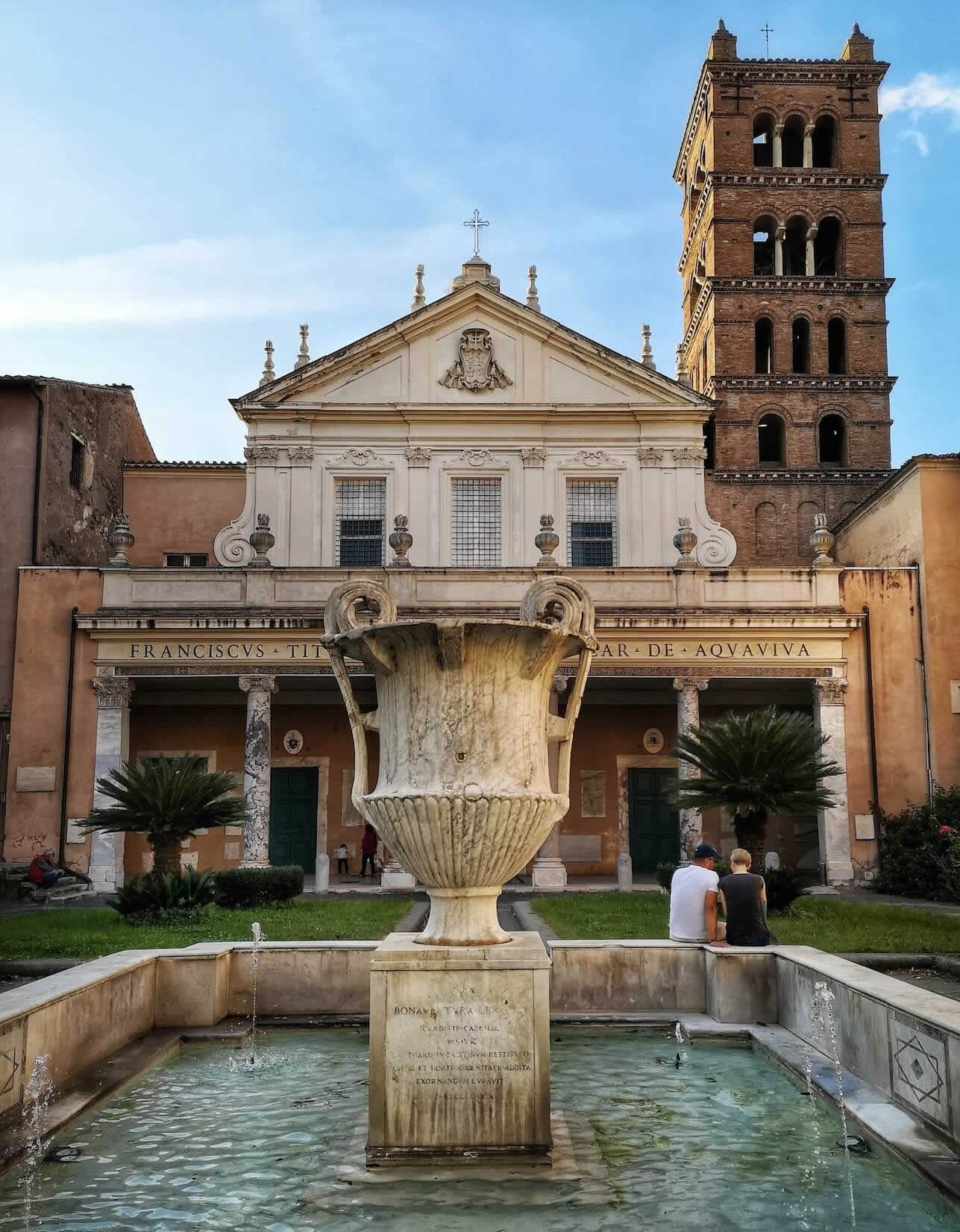
Cantharus of Santa Cecilia in Trastevere

Around the time of Tertullian, an early Church Father, it was customary for Christians to wash their hands (manulavium), face (capitilavium) and feet (pedilavium) before prayer, as well as before receiving Holy Communion. Churches from the time of Constantine the Great were thus built with an esonarthex that included a fountain known as a cantharus, where Christians would wash their hands, face and feet before entering the worship space (cf. Exodus 30:17–21); they continue to be used in Orthodox Christian churches. The practice of ablutions before prayer and worship in Christianity symbolizes "separation from sins of the spirit and surrender to the Lord."

As early as the 2nd century, Christians hung a cross on the east wall of their houses, to which they prostrated in front of, as they prayed at seven fixed prayer times (cf. Psalm 119:164); Apostolic Tradition enjoined washing before these supplications to God. Before praying these canonical hours at seven fixed prayer times in the eastward direction of prayer, Christians belonging to the Mar Thoma Syrian Church, an Oriental Protestant denomination, as well as the Oriental Orthodox Churches such as the Coptic Orthodox Church, Indian Orthodox Church and Ethiopian Orthodox Church, wash their hands, face and feet (cf. Shehimo and Agpeya).

John Chrysostom, a prominent Church Father of Christianity revered in the Orthodox, Nestorian, Catholic, Lutheran and Anglican traditions, taught that people should wash their hands before picking up a copy of the Bible (he enjoined women to wear a headcovering if they were not already veiled at home prior to touching the Bible). This is to show respect for the Bible and in the East, Christians place their copies of Scripture in a rehal to elevate its position.

Oriental Orthodox Churches such as the Coptic Orthodox, Ethiopian Orthodox, Eritrean Orthodox, places a heavier emphasis on Old Testament teachings, and its followers adhere to certain practices such as observeing days of ritual purification.

In Eastern Christianity, including Oriental Orthodox Christianity, as with some Western Orthodox Christian traditions, shoes are removed in order to acknowledge that one is offering prayer before a holy God.

Among Old Ritualists in the Russian Christian tradition, a prayer rug known as a Podruchnik is used to keep one's face and hands clean during prostrations, as these parts of the body are used to make the sign of the cross.

Christian denominations of the Schwarzenau Brethren tradition practice footwashing in their regular celebrations of the Lovefeast, prior to receiving Holy Communion and eating.

== Sex and menstruation ==
In Oriental Orthodox Christianity, the "holiness of the Church is traditionally tied scripturally with the Jerusalem Temple". As such, believers fast after midnight and "sexual intercourse is prohibited the night before communion" (cf. Eucharistic discipline).

In the Ethiopian Orthodox Church, an Oriental Orthodox Christian denomination, men are not permitted to enter a church the day after they have had sexual intercourse with their wives. People who are ritually unclean may approach the church but are not permitted to enter it; they instead stand near the church door and pray during the liturgy. The Ethiopian Orthodox Tewahedo Church prescribes several kinds of hand washing for example after leaving the latrine, lavatory or bathhouse, or before prayer, or after eating a meal.

Pope Dionysius of Alexandria taught that with regard to menstruating women that "not even they themselves, being faithful and pious, would dare when in this state either to approach the Holy Table or to touch the body and blood of Christ." As such, Oriental Orthodox Christian women, such as those belonging to the Coptic Orthodox Church, are not permitted to receive Holy Communion while they are menstruating.

Covenant theology largely views the Christian sacrament of baptism as fulfilling the Israelite practice of circumcision, both being signs and seals of the covenant of grace (cf. Circumcision controversy in early Christianity). Since the Council of Florence, the Roman Catholic Church forbade the practice of circumcision among Christians, a position also taught by the Lutheran Church; Roman Catholic scholars, including John J. Dietzen, David Lang, and Edwin F. Healy, teach that "elective male infant circumcision not only violates the proper application of the time-honored principle of totality, but even fits the ethical definition of mutilation, which is gravely sinful." Roman Catholicism generally is silent today with respect to its permissibility, though elective circumcision continues to be debated amongst theologians. On the other hand, circumcision is an established practice and customary in Coptic Christianity, the Ethiopian Orthodox Church and the Eritrean Orthodox Church, all of which observe it as a rite of passage, and males are generally required to be circumcised shortly after birth. Even though mainstream Christian denominations do not require the practice and maintain a neutral position on it, circumcision is widely practiced in many Christian countries and communities.

== Christian dietary laws and fasting ==
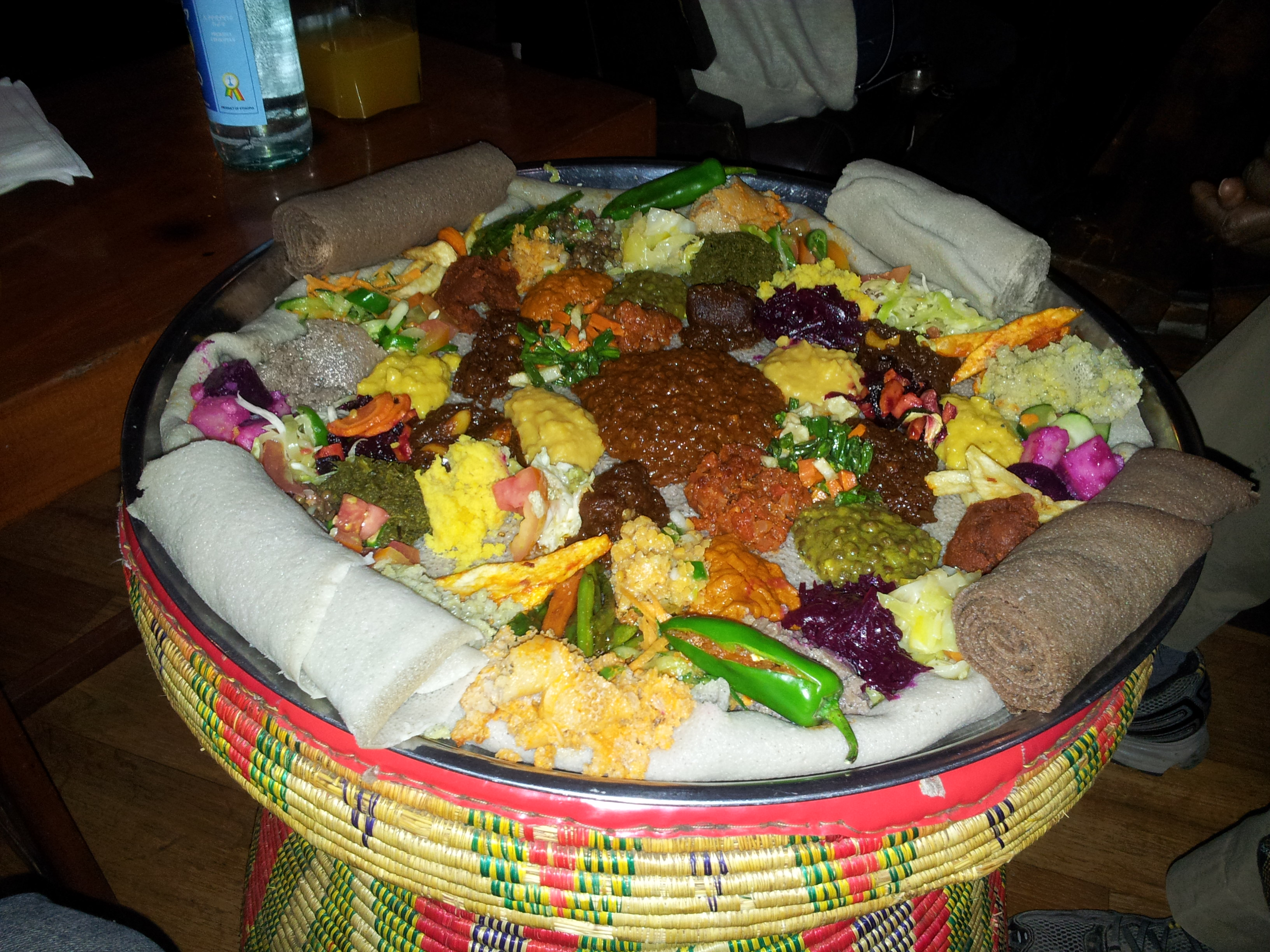
A vegan Ethiopian Yetsom beyaynetu, compatible with fasting rules

In the Ethiopian Orthodox Church, an Oriental Orthodox Christian denomination, washing one's hands is required before and after consuming food. This is followed by prayer, in which Christians often pray to ask God to thank him for and bless their food before consuming it at the time of eating meals, such as breakfast. The wording of these mealtime prayers vary per Christian denomination, e.g. the common table prayer is used by communicants of the Lutheran churches and the Moravian Church.

Christian vegetarianism was widespread in the early Church, among both the clergy and laity. Since eating meat was traditionally viewed as a luxury, many Christians may choose to practice vegetarianism as their Lenten sacrifice during the penetential season of Lent in the Christian calendar.

With respect to meat consumption, in Oriental Orthodox Christianity, in denominations such as the Armenian Apostolic Church and Ethiopian Orthodox Church, slaughtering animals for food is done with one strike in the name of the trinitarian formula (cf. Jhatka).

Some Christians believe that meat consumed should not retain any blood.

The Friday Fast from meat is observed by Christians of the Catholic, Oriental Orthodox, Church of the East, Methodist, and Anglican traditions, especially during the season of Lent in the Christian calendar.

The Baptist, Methodist and Pentecostal traditions of Christianity prohibit the consumption of alcohol (cf. teetotalism). On the other hand other Christian denominations condone moderate drinking of alcohol, including the Catholic, Lutheran, Oriental Orthodox, and Eastern Orthodox traditions. However, all Christian churches, in view of the biblical teaching on drunkenness, universally condemn drunkenness as sinful.

== External apparel ==
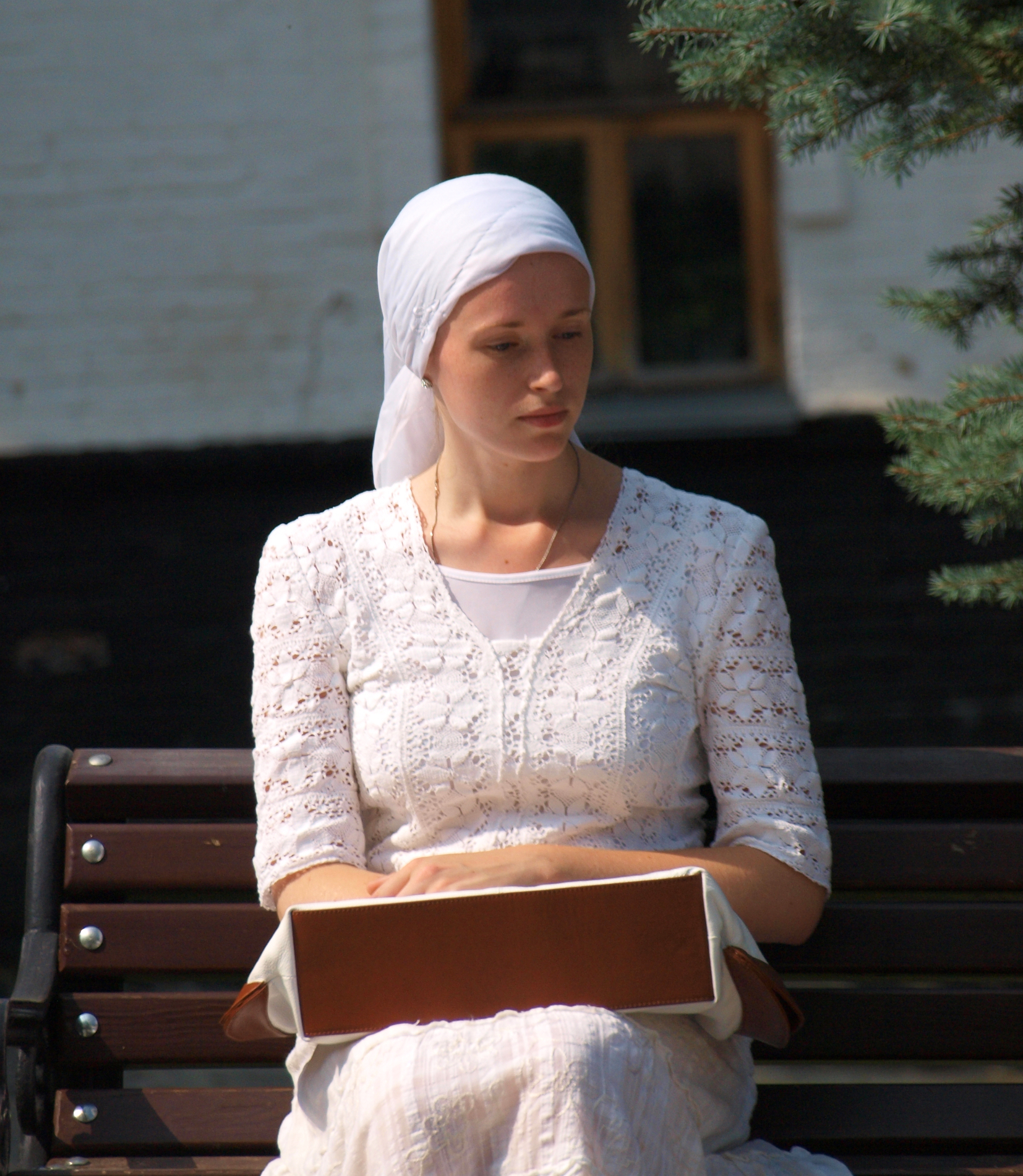
In many Christian denominations, women wear headcoverings when praying and worshipping.

In Christianity, members of the Eastern Orthodox Church are expected to wear a cross necklace at all times; these are ordinarily given to believers at their baptism. This practice is derived from Canon 73 and Canon 82 of the Sixth Ecumenical Council

[A]ll the Church (Sunday) School children [must] wear a cross knowing how spiritually beneficial it is for them. By wearing a cross the child is protected from evil forces, it invites the grace of the Holy Cross of Christ, it brings His Divine blessing upon the child, it gives the child a sense that he or she belongs to Christ, that he or she has a special identity, that of a Christian, it is a reminder that Christ is always with him/her, it reminds the child that Jesus died on the Cross to save him/her, that Jesus Christ is our Only Savior and the True God. By wearing a cross the child feels the love of God and gives the child hope and strength to overcome any obstacle in his or her life.

Christian headcovering with a cloth veil was universally taught by the Church Fathers. As such, in many Christian denominations, such as the Oriental Orthodox Churches and Old Ritualists of the Russian Christian tradition, as well in the Anabaptist churches, women wear headcoverings when praying and worshipping.

In denominations of the conservative holiness movement such as the Allegheny Wesleyan Methodist Connection and Evangelical Wesleyan Church, when in public, women are enjoined to wear clothing with sleeves extended past the elbows and "Women's hemlines are to be modestly below the knees" (cf. outward holiness).

== Gallery ==
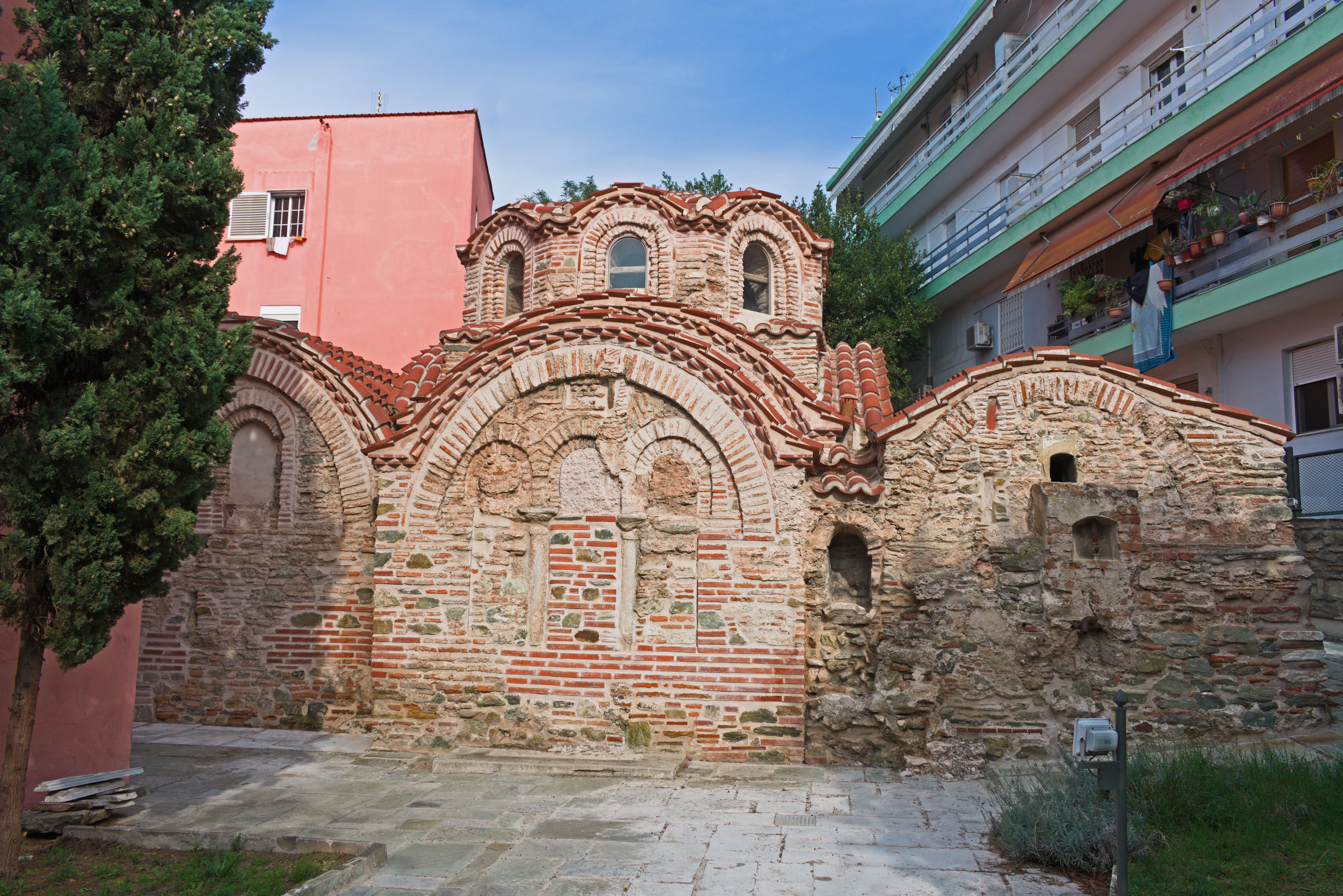
Byzantine Bath in Thessaloniki

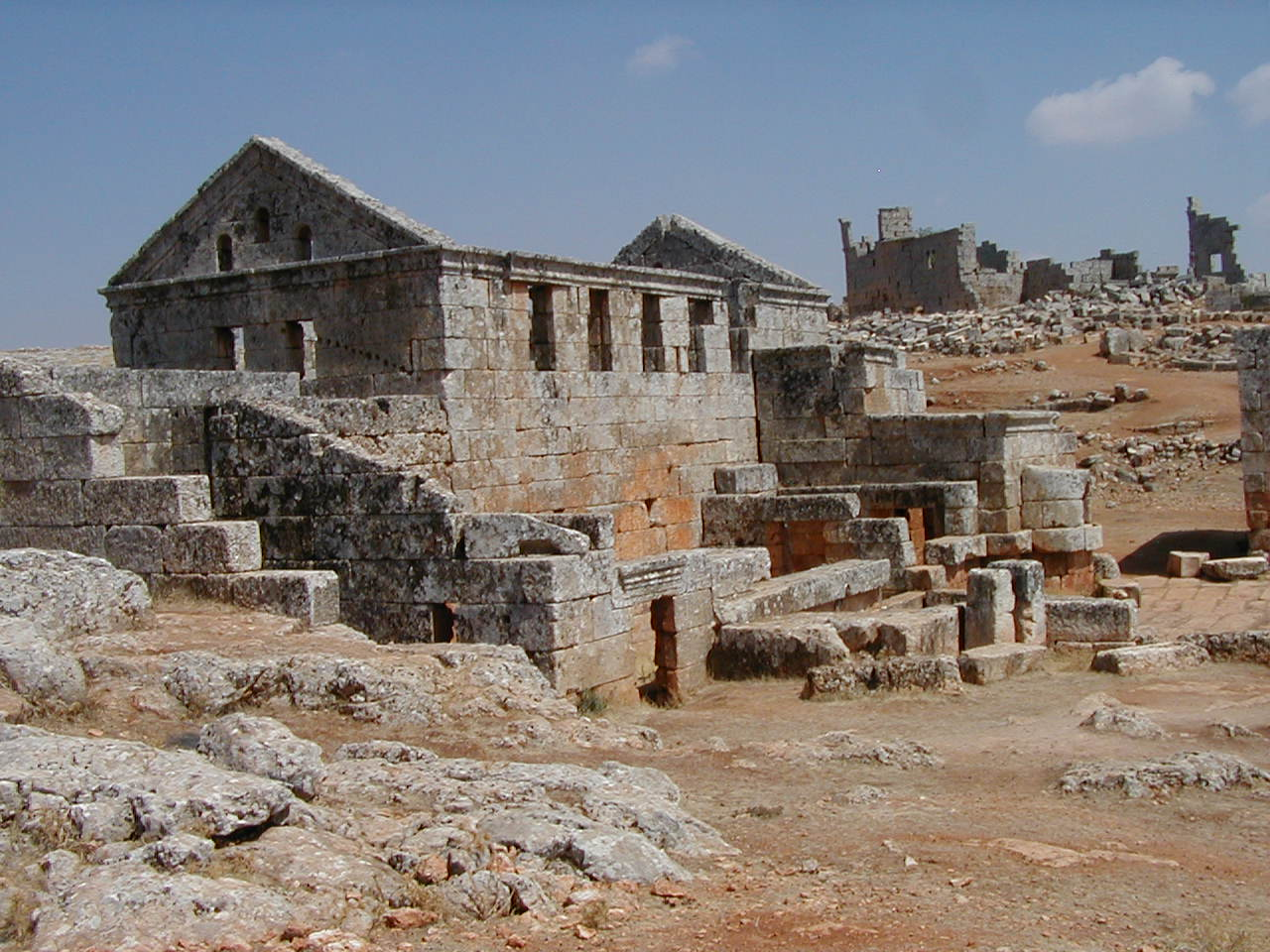
Byzantine Bath of Serjilla

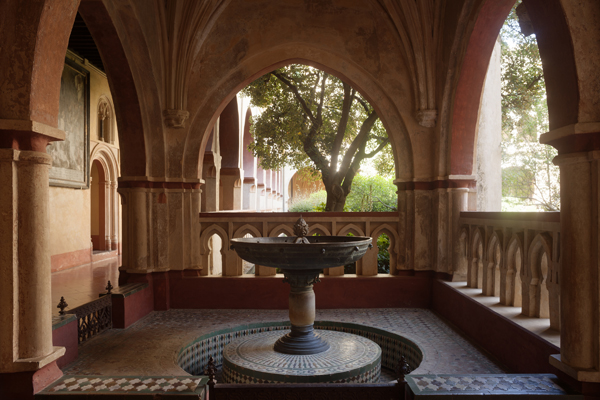
Lavabo of the cloister of the Monastery of Guadalupe (Spain)

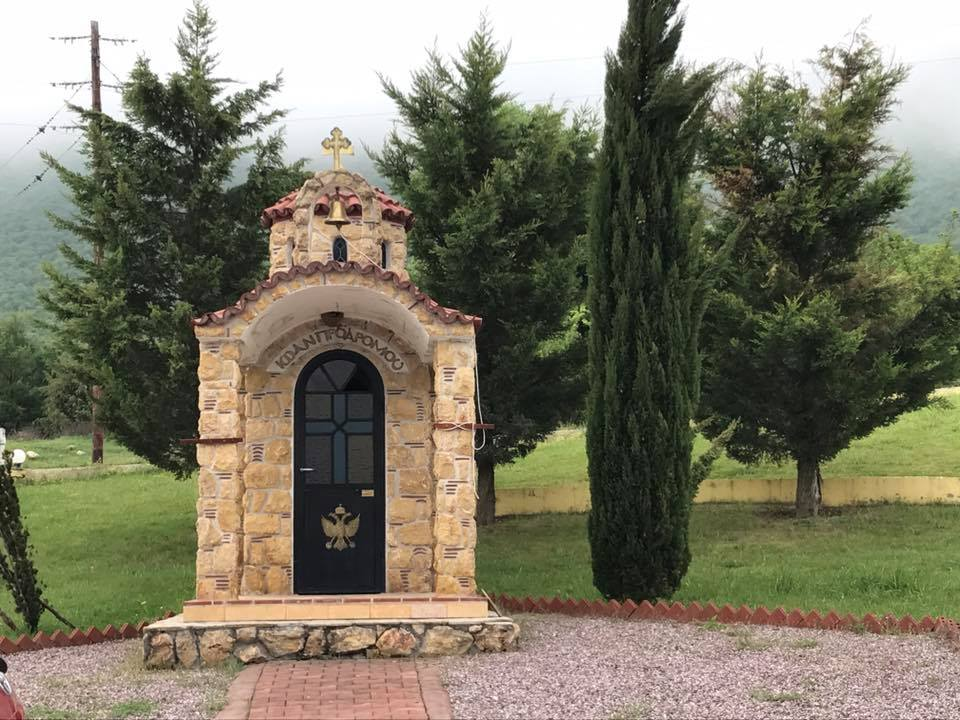
Chapel of the Byzantine Bath of Agkistro

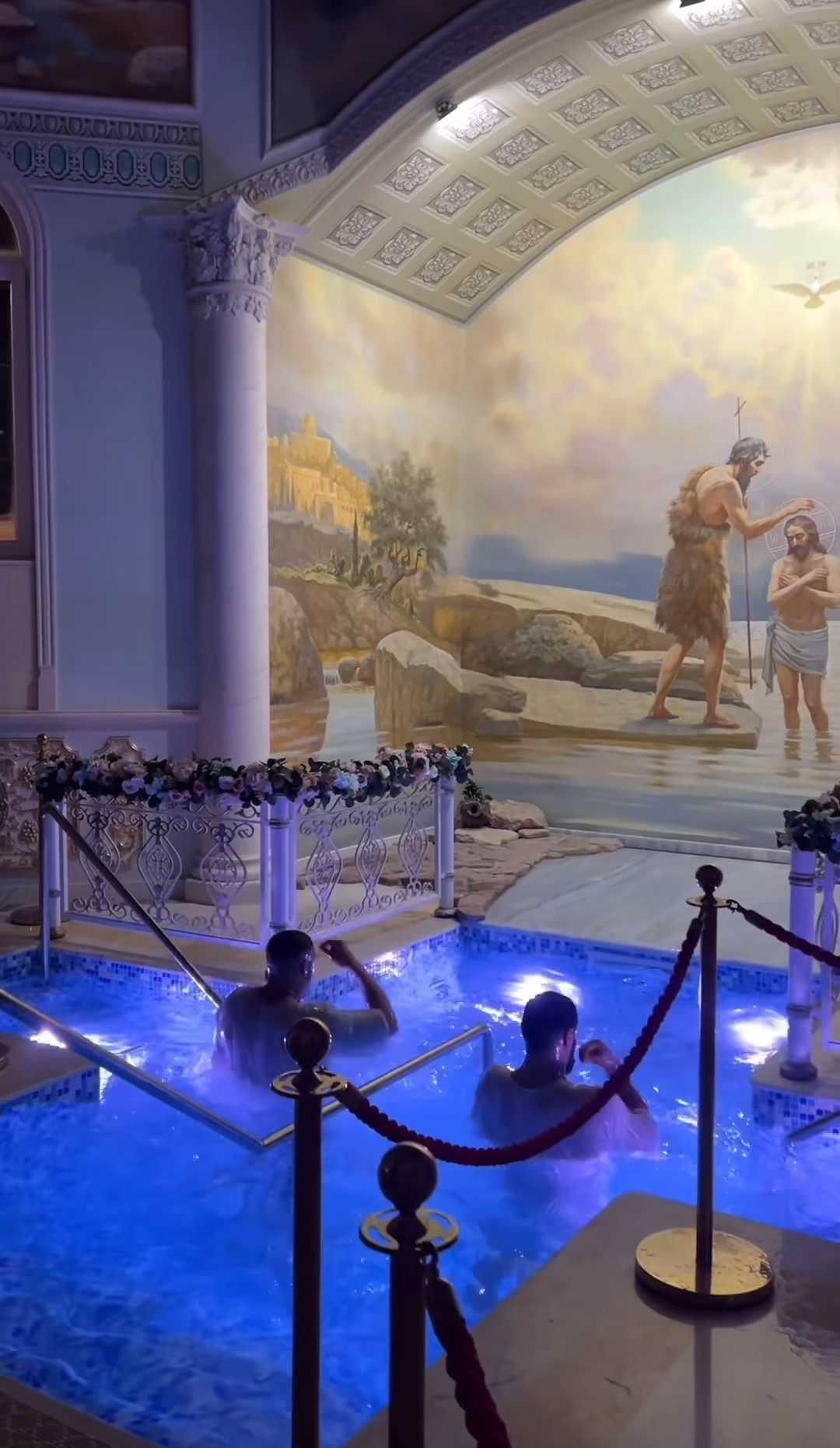
Ablution pool in a Russian Orthodox church

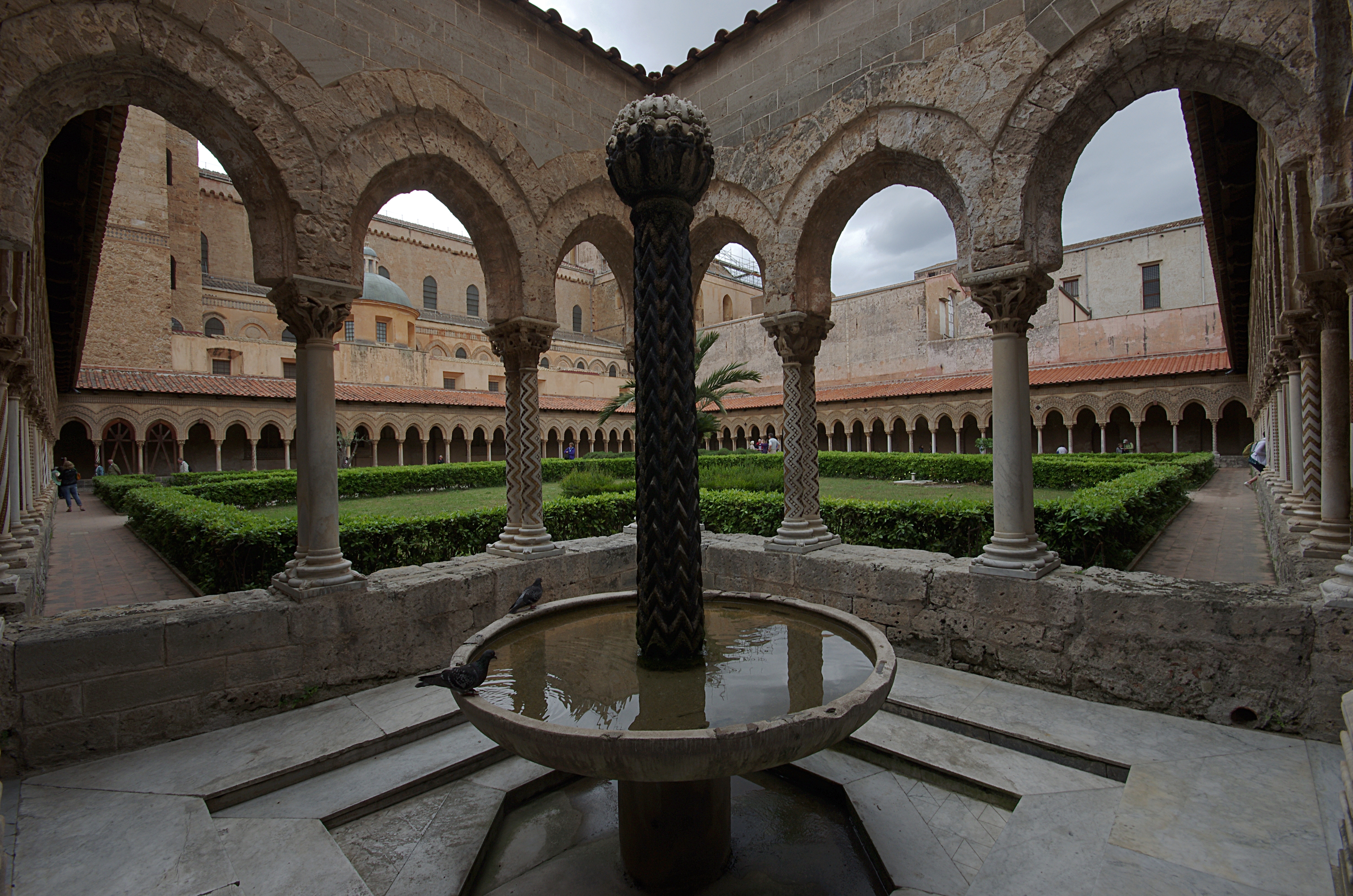
Lavabo in the Cloister of the Monreale Cathedral (Italy)

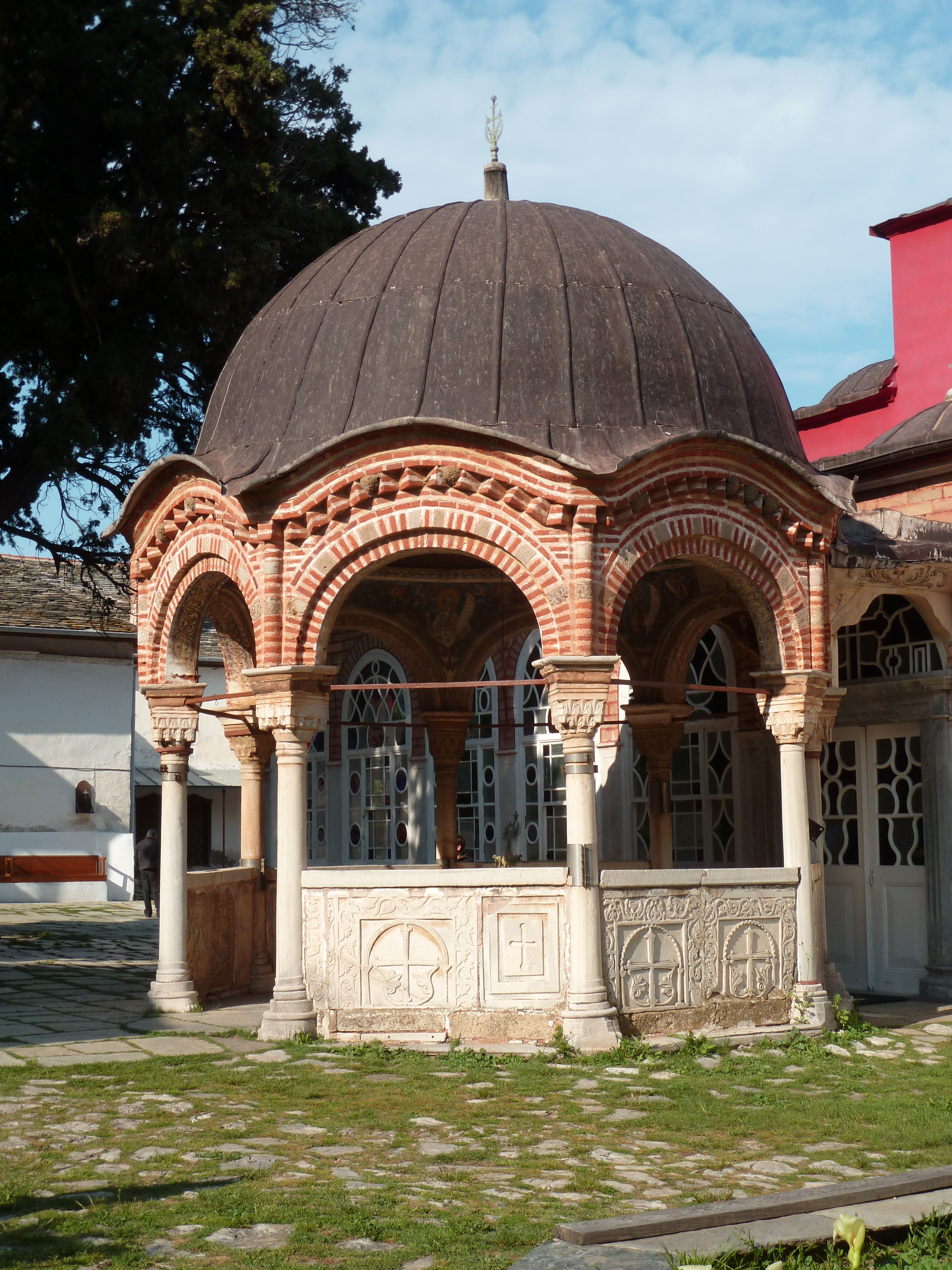
Cantharus at the Monastery of Great Lavra (Greece)

Lavabo of Mosteiro da Batalha (Portugal)

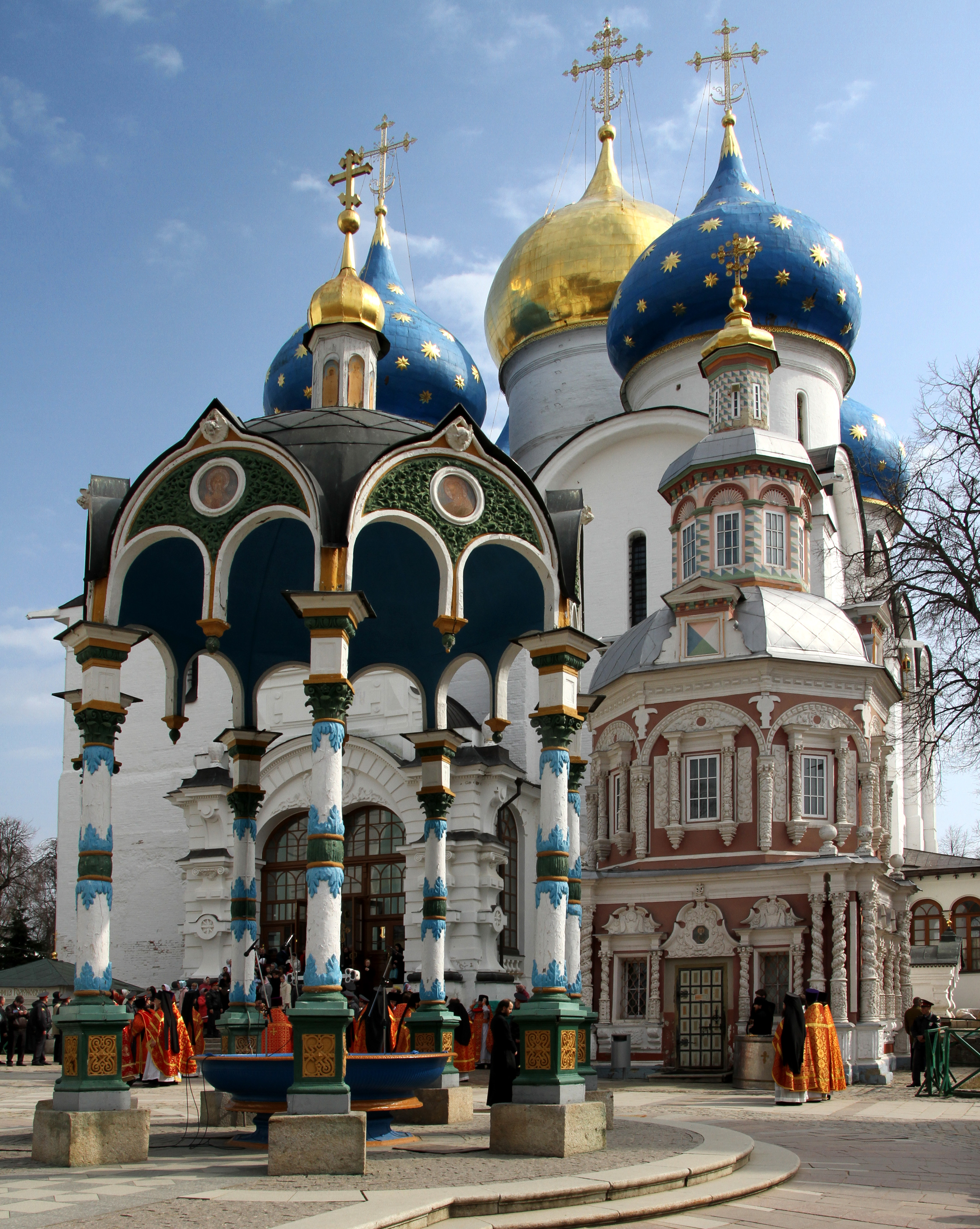
Cantharus at Trinity Lavra of St. Sergius (Russia)

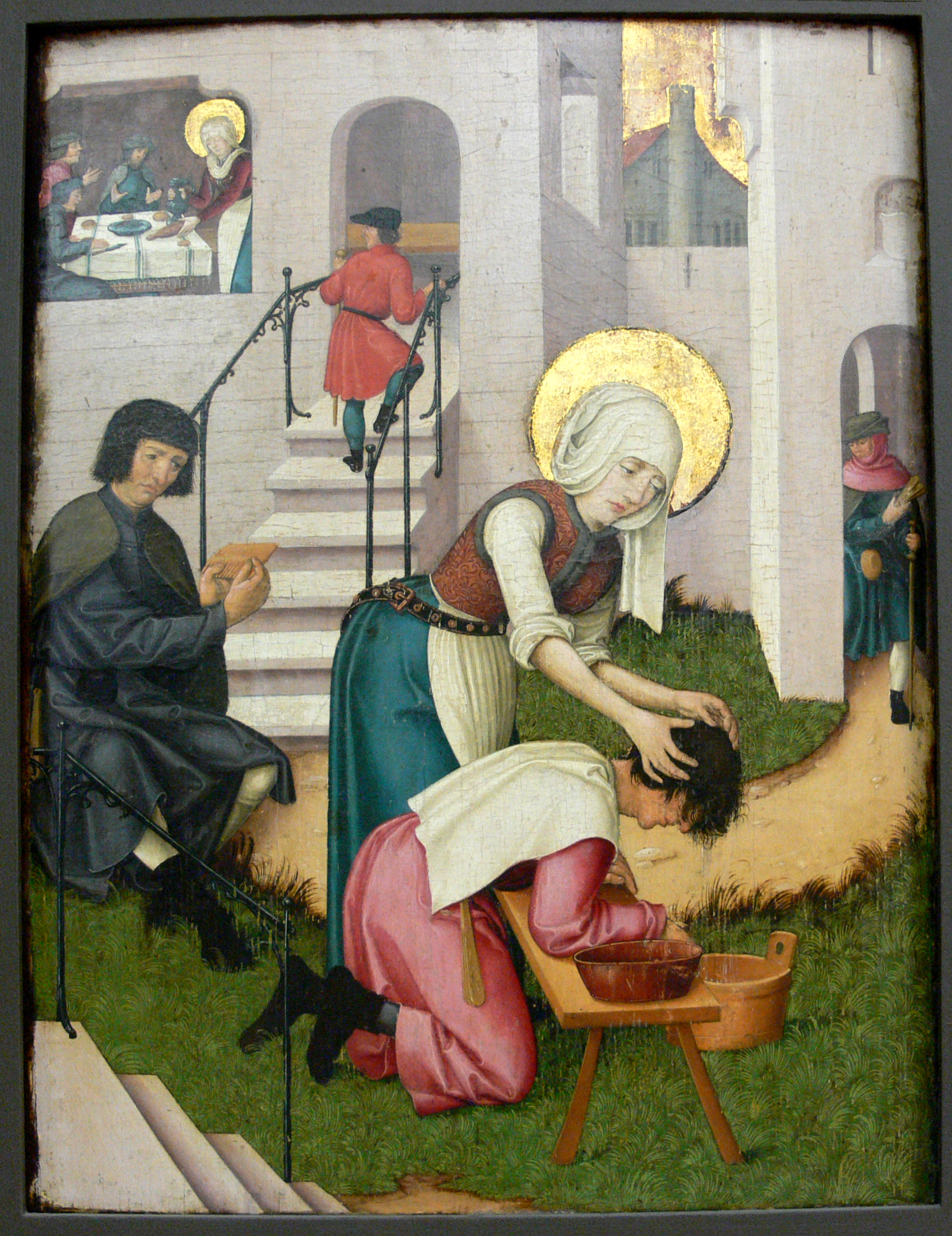
Verena of Zurzach; the patron saint of sick and lepers, among other things

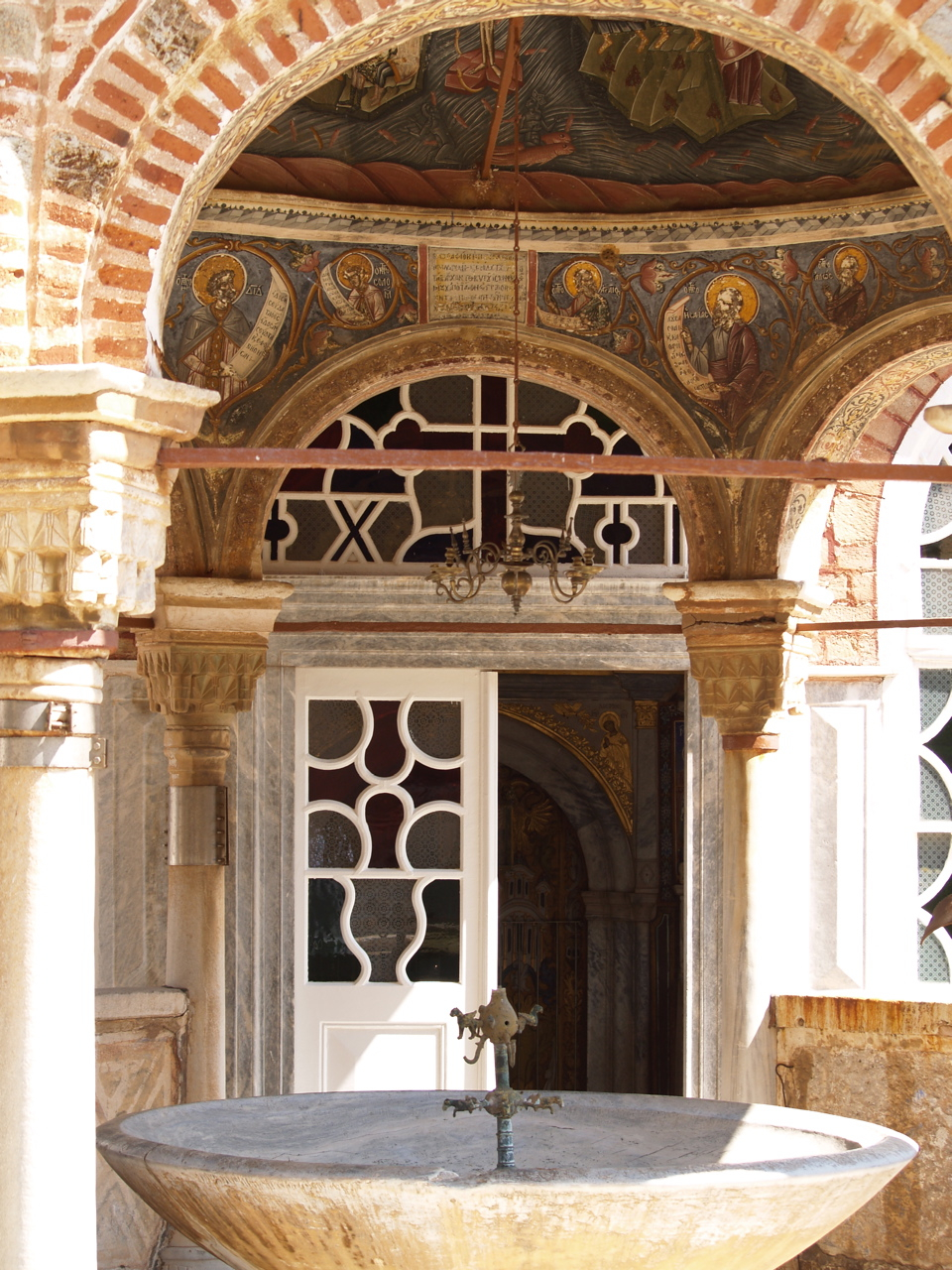
Cantharus at the Monastery of Great Lavra (Mount Athos)

== See also ==
- Churching of women
- Islamic hygienical jurisprudence
- Religion and health
