= Cantharus (Christianity) =

Fountain used by Christians for ablution before entering a church

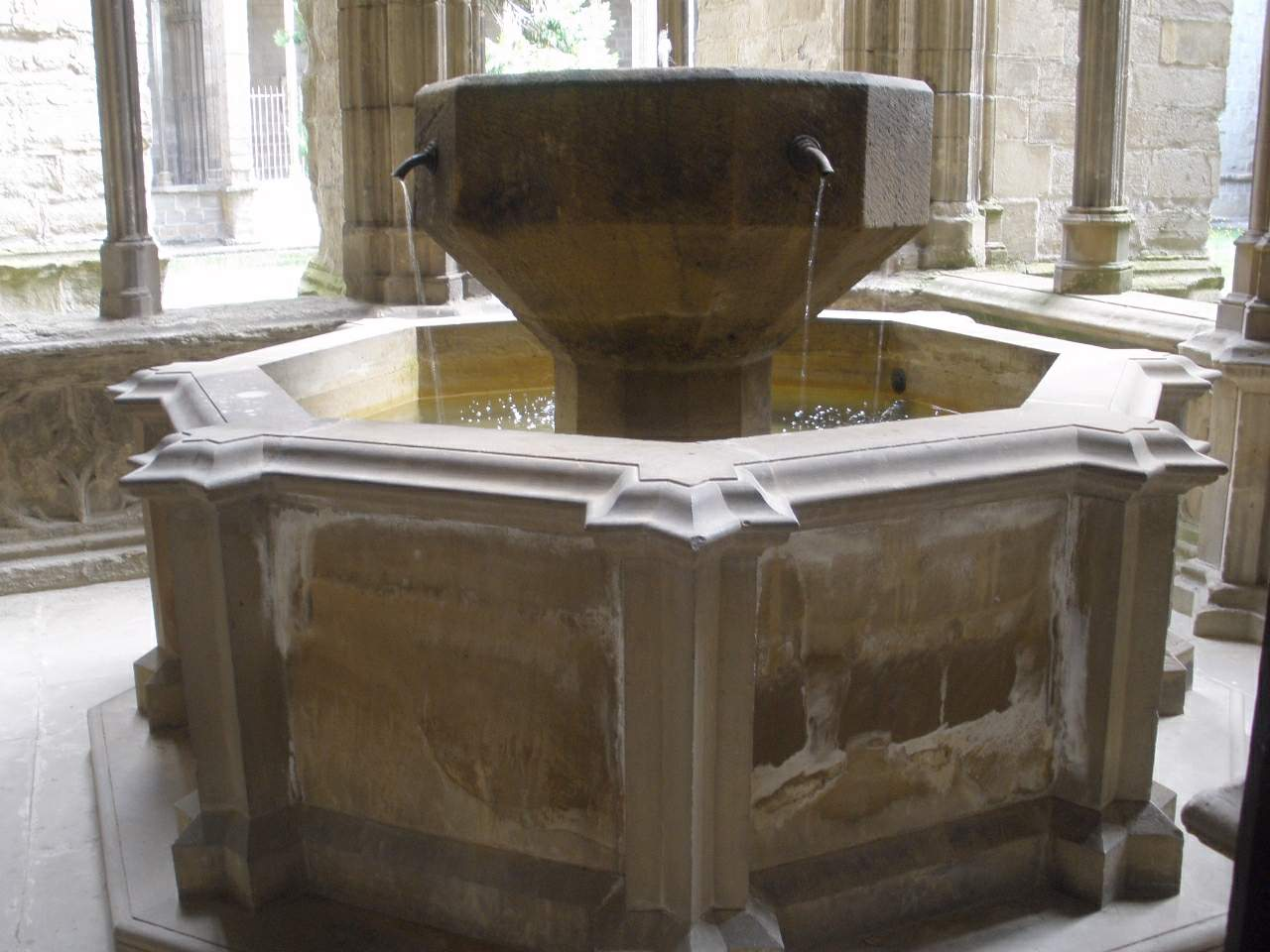
Cantharus of Pamplona Cathedral in Spain.

A cantharus, also known as a phiala, is a fountain used by Christians for ablution before entering a church. These ablutions involve the washing of the hands, face, and feet. The cantharus is traditionally located in the exonarthex of the church. The water emitted by a cantharus is to be running water. The practice of ablutions before prayer and worship in Christianity symbolizes "separation from sins of the spirit and surrender to the Lord." Eusebius recorded this practice of canthari located in the courtyards of churches, for the faithful to wash themselves before entering a Christian house of worship. The practice has its origins Jewish practice of performing ablutions before entering into the presence of God (cf. Exodus 30:17–21). In the present-day, canthari are found in Eastern Christian and Oriental Christian churches, though in Western Christianity (especially in the Roman Catholic, Lutheran and Anglican traditions) the cantharus gradually transformed into the holy water font.

== Gallery ==
Famous canthari found throughout Christendom:

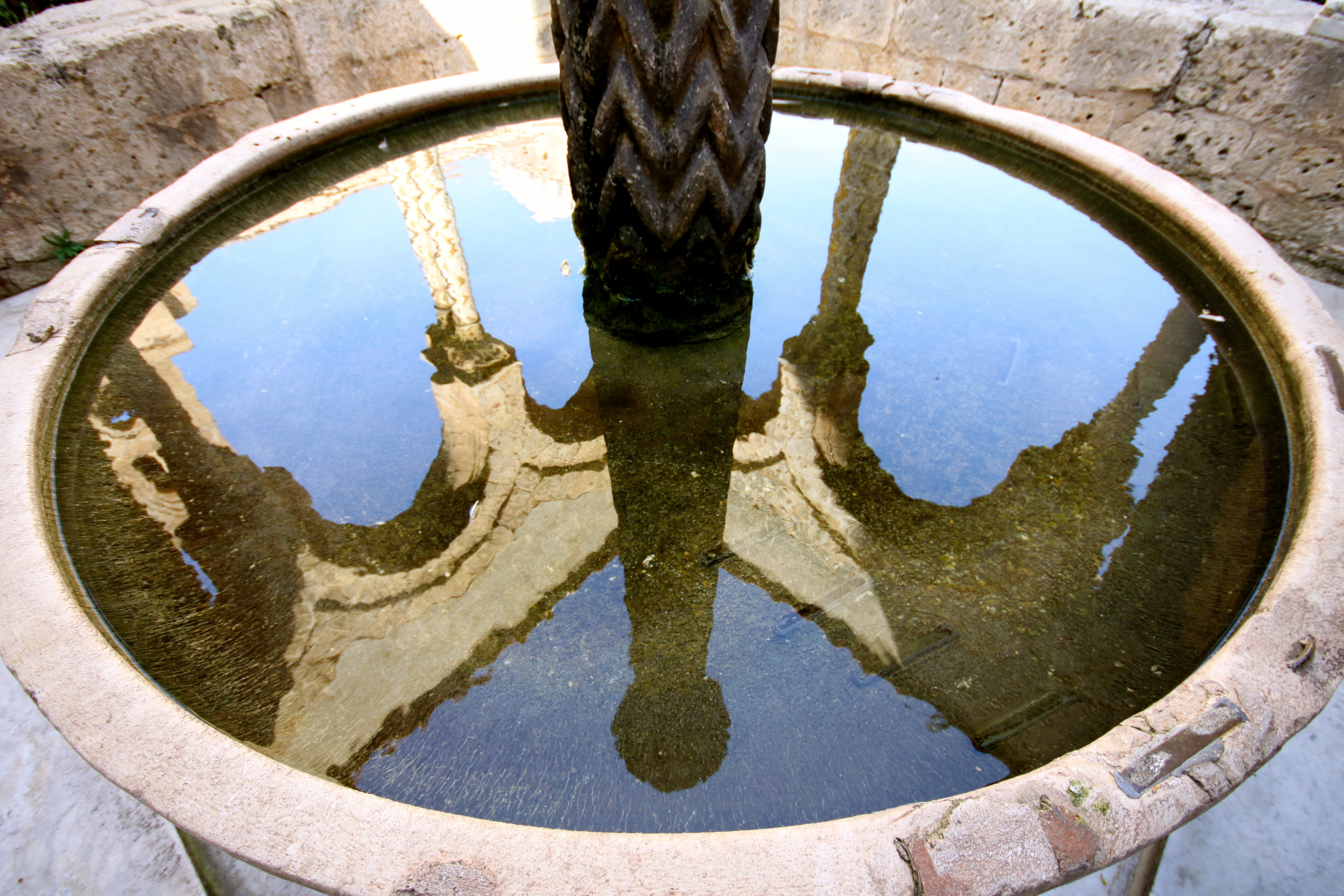
Cantharus of Monreale Cathedral (Italy)

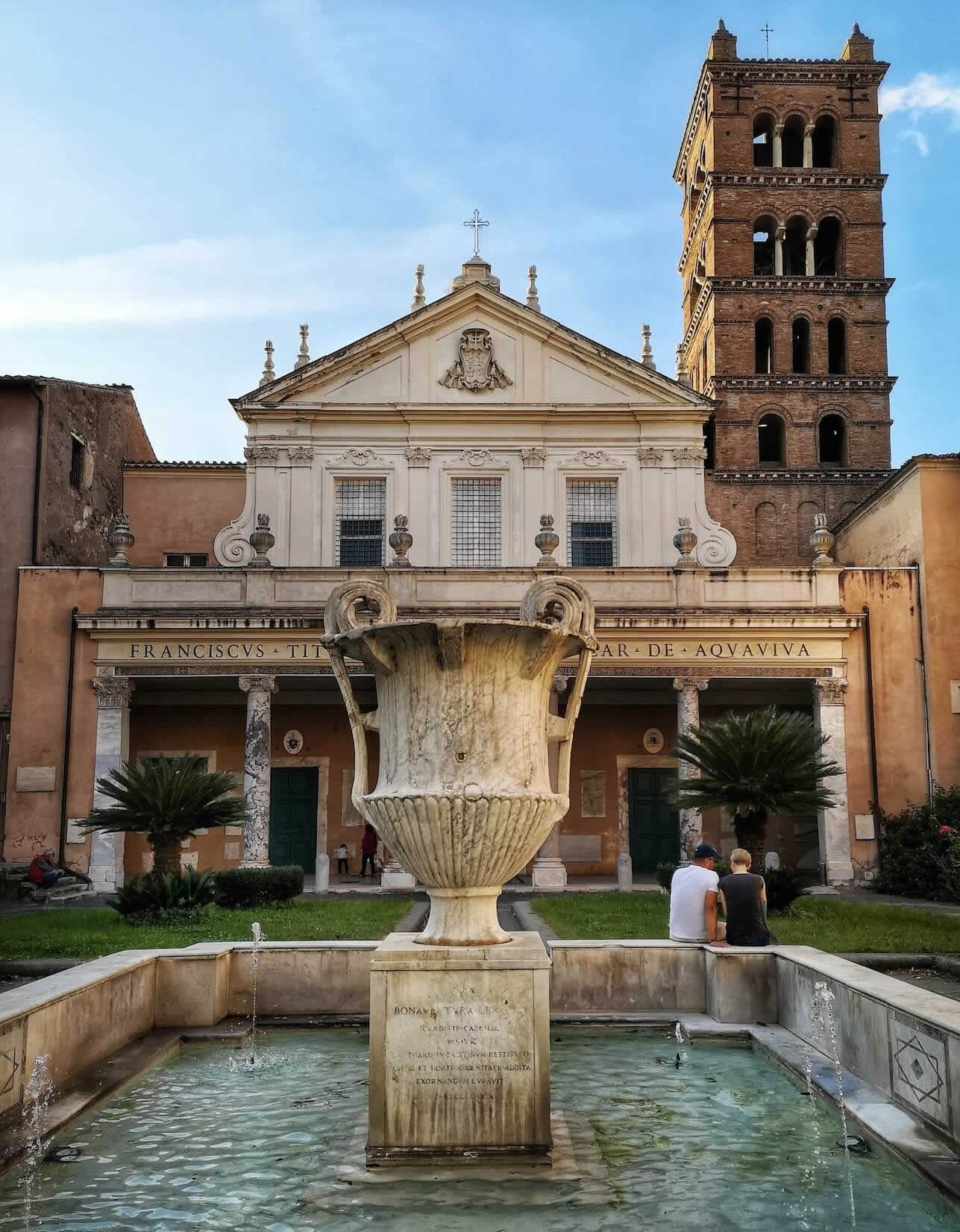
Cantharus of Santa Cecilia in Trastevere (Italy)

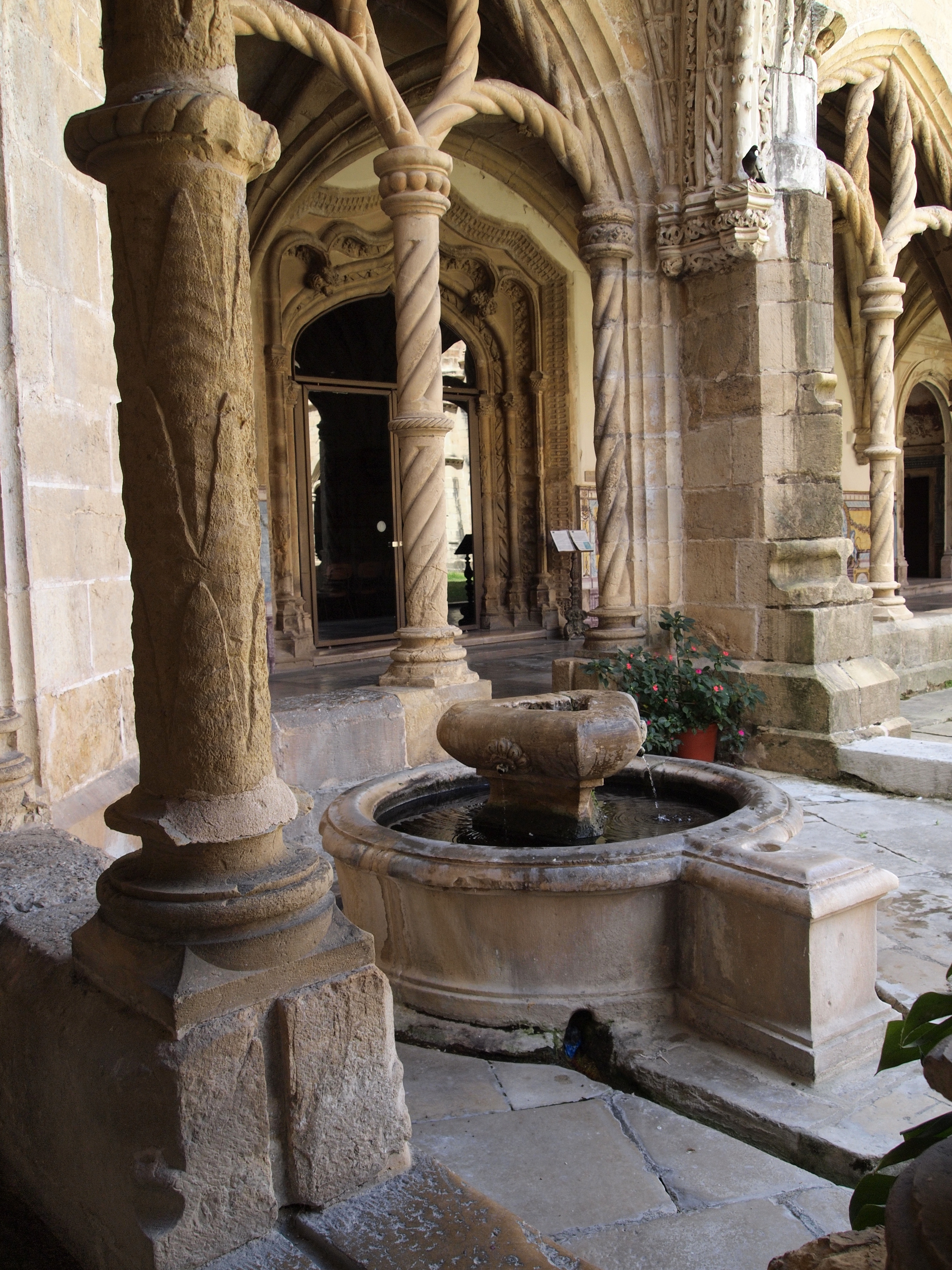
Cantharus at the Old Cathedral of Coimbra (Portugal)

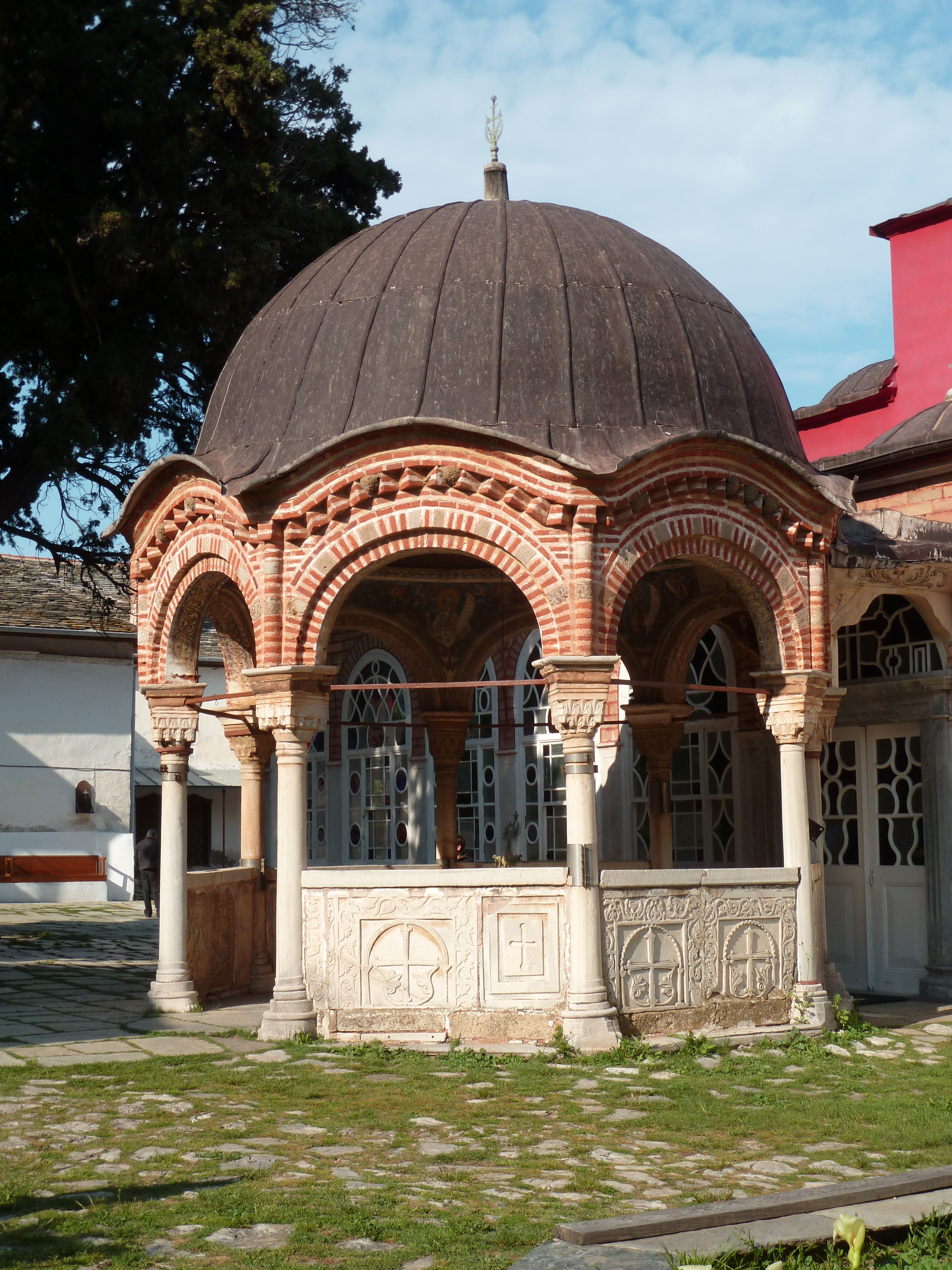
Cantharus at Great Lavra Church (Greece)

== See also ==
- Seven fixed prayer times
- Home stoup, used by Christians for blessing oneself
- Hygiene in Christianity
- Lavabo, used by Christian priests in performing liturgical ablutions
- Lavatorium, used by Christians monks for communal washing before meals
- Maundy, the Christian rite of footwashing
- Sebil (fountain), an Islamic fountain for ritual ablutions
- Shadirvan, an Islamic fountain for ritual ablutions
- Tradition of removing shoes in the home and houses of worship
