= Ablution in Christianity =

Prescribed washing

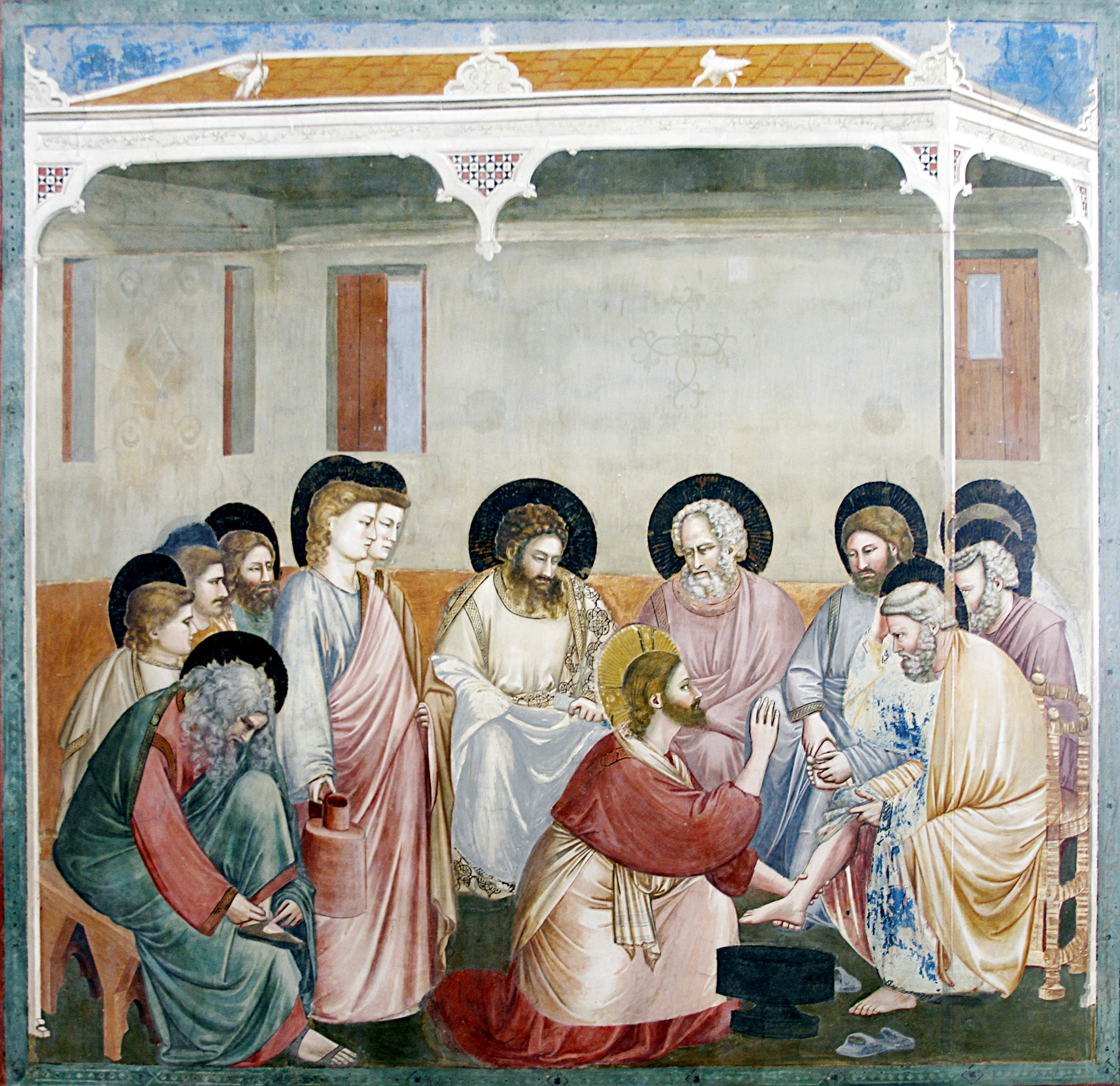
Christ washing the feet of the Apostles, by Giotto di Bondone (Cappella Scrovegni a Padova).

In Christianity, ablution is a prescribed washing of part or all of the body or possessions, such as clothing or ceremonial objects, with the intent of purification or dedication. In Christianity, both baptism and footwashing are forms of ablution. Before praying the canonical hours at seven fixed prayer times, Oriental Orthodox Christians wash their hands and face (cf. Agpeya, Shehimo). In liturgical churches, ablution can refer to purifying fingers or vessels related to the Eucharist. In the New Testament, washing also occurs in reference to rites of Judaism part of the action of a healing by Jesus, the preparation of a body for burial, the washing of nets by fishermen, a person's personal washing of the face to appear in public, the cleansing of an injured person's wounds, Pontius Pilate's washing of his hands as a symbolic claim of innocence and foot washing, which is a rite within the Christian Churches. According to the Gospel of Matthew, Pontius Pilate declared himself innocent of the blood of Jesus by washing his hands. This act of Pilate may not, however, have been borrowed from the custom of the Jews. The same practice was common among the Greeks and Romans.

According to Christian tradition, the Pharisees carried the practice of ablution to great excess. The Gospel of Mark refers to their ceremonial ablutions: "For the Pharisees...wash their hands 'oft'" or, more accurately, "with the fist" (R.V., "diligently"); or, as Theophylact of Bulgaria explains it, "up to the elbow", referring to the actual word used in the Greek New Testament, πυγμή pygmē, which refers to the arm from the elbow to the tips of the fingers. In the Book of Acts, Paul and other men performed ablution before entering the Temple in Jerusalem: "Then Paul took the men, and the next day purifying himself with them entered into the temple, to signify the accomplishment of the days of purification, until that an offering should be offered for every one of them."

In the Old Testament, ablution was considered a prerequisite to approaching God, whether by means of sacrifice, prayer, or entering a holy place. Around the time of Tertullian, an early Church Father, it was customary for Christians to wash their hands (manulavium), head (capitilavium) and feet (pedilavium) before prayer, as well as before receiving Holy Communion. The rite of footwashing employed a basin of water and linen towels, done in the imitation of Christ (as recorded by the early Christian apologist Tertullian). Churches from the time of Constantine the Great were thus built with an exonarthex that included a cantharus where Christians would wash their hands, face and feet before entering the worship space. The practice of ablutions before prayer and worship in Christianity symbolizes "separation from sins of the spirit and surrender to the Lord."

The Bible has many rituals of purification relating to menstruation, childbirth, sexual relations, nocturnal emission, unusual bodily fluids, skin disease, death, and animal sacrifices. The Biblical rituals of purification ranging in areas from the mundane private rituals of personal hygiene and toilet etiquette to the complex public rituals of social etiquette. John Chrysostom, a prominent Church Father of Christianity revered in the Orthodox, Nestorian, Catholic, Lutheran and Anglican traditions, taught that people should wash their hands before picking up a copy of the Bible (he enjoined women to wear a headcovering if they were not already veiled at home prior to touching the Bible). This is to show respect for the Bible and in the Middle East and in the Indian subcontinent, Christians place their copies of Scripture in a rehal to have it rest in an elevated position. The Ethiopian Orthodox Tewahedo Church prescribes several kinds of hand washing for example after leaving the latrine, lavatory or bathhouse, or before prayer, or after eating a meal. The women in the Ethiopian Orthodox Tewahedo Church are prohibited from entering the church temple during menses; and the men do not enter a church the day after they have had intercourse with their wives.

Christianity has always placed a strong emphasis on hygiene. The early Church denounced the mixed bathing prevalent in Roman pools, as well as the pagan custom of women naked bathing in front of men; as such the Didascalia Apostolorum, an early Christian manual, enjoined believing men and women to use baths that were separated by gender, which contributed to hygiene and good health according to the Church Father Clement of Alexandria. The Church also built public bathing facilities that were separate for both sexes near monasteries and pilgrimage sites; also, the popes situated baths within church basilicas and monasteries since the early Middle Ages. Pope Gregory the Great urged his followers on value of bathing as a bodily need. Contrary to popular belief bathing and sanitation were not lost in Europe with the collapse of the Roman Empire. Soapmaking first became an established trade during the so-called "Dark Ages". The Romans used scented oils (mostly from Egypt), among other alternatives. By the mid-19th century, the English urbanised middle classes had formed an ideology of cleanliness that ranked alongside typical Victorian concepts, such as Christianity, respectability and social progress. The Salvation Army has adopted movement of the deployment of the personal hygiene, and by providing personal hygiene products.

== Ablution in the Bible ==
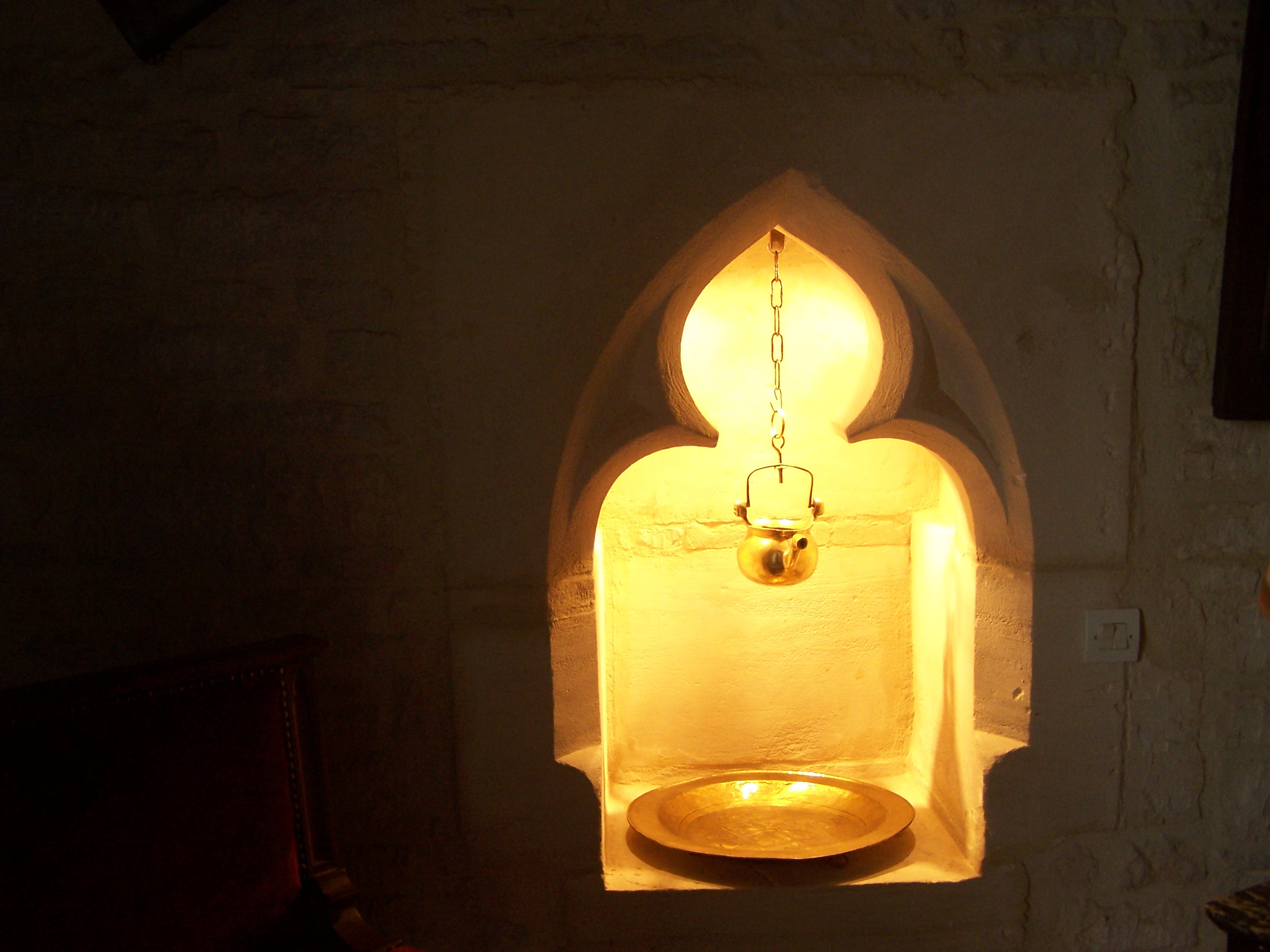
A 14th-century lavabo as a niche recessed into the side wall of a sanctuary in Amblie, Normandy

The Bible has many rituals of purification relating to menstruation, childbirth, sexual relations, nocturnal emission, unusual bodily fluids, skin disease, death, and animal sacrifices. In the Old Testament, ablution was considered a prerequisite to approaching God, whether by means of sacrifice, prayer, or entering a holy place.

The Bible includes various regulations about bathing:

And whoever he that hath issue (a zav, ejaculant with an unusual discharge) touches without having rinsed his hands in water, he shall wash his clothes, and bathe himself in water, and be unclean until the evening.(Leviticus 15:11)

A subsequent seven clean days are then required, culminating in a ritual and temple offering before the zav is clean of his malady:

Now in case the one having a running discharge would become clean from his running discharge, he must then count for himself seven days for his purification, and he must wash his garments and bathe his flesh in running water; and he must be clean. And on the eighth day he should take for himself two turtledoves or two young pigeons, and he must come to the entrance of the tent of meeting and give them to the priest.(Leviticus 15:13–14)

And also references to hand-washing:

I will wash my hands in innocence; so will I compass Thine altar, O LORD (Psalms 26:6)

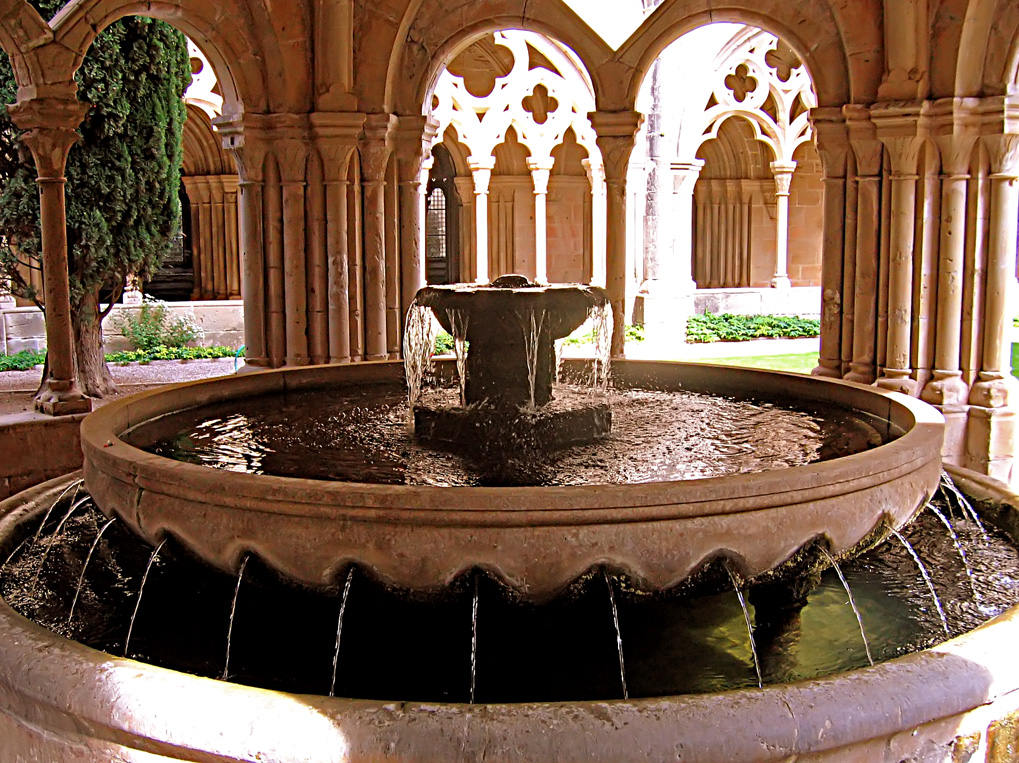
Lavabo in the Poblet Monastery in Spain

The Mikveh in the Bible is a bath used for the purpose of ritual immersion. The word is employed in its broader sense but generally means a collection of water. Several biblical regulations specify that full immersion in water is required to regain ritual purity after ritually impure incidents have occurred. A person was required to be ritually pure in order to enter the Temple. In this context, "purity" and "impurity" are imperfect translations of the Hebrew "tahara" and "tumah", respectively, in that the negative connotation of the word impurity is not intended; rather being "impure" is indicative of being in a state in which certain things are prohibited until one has become "pure" again by immersion in a mikveh.

After the destruction of the Temple, the mikveh's main uses remained as follows:

- by women to achieve ritual purity after menstruation or childbirth before she and her husband may resume marital relations;
- by men to achieve ritual purity;
- to immerse newly acquired utensils used in serving and eating food.

== Ablution in the Christian traditions ==
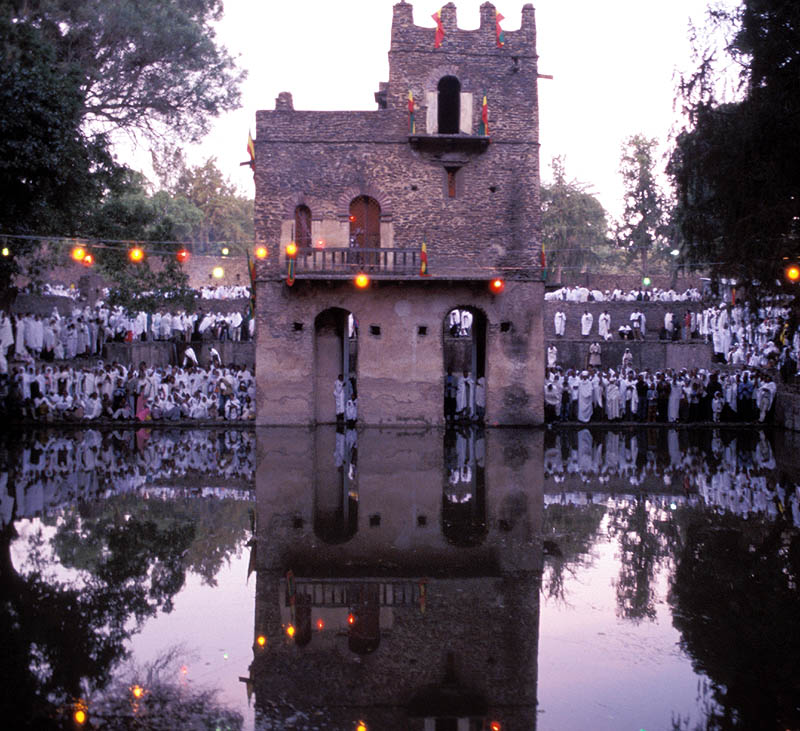
Crowds gather at the Fasiladas' bath in Ethiopia, to celebrate Epiphany

Traditionally, Christianity adhered to the biblical regulation requiring the purification of women after childbirth; this practice, was adapted into a special ritual known as the churching of women, for which there exists liturgy in the Church of England's Book of Common Prayer, but its use is now rare in Western Christianity. The churching of women is still performed in a number of Eastern Christian churches (Eastern Orthodox, Oriental Orthodox and Eastern Catholic churches).

Oriental Orthodox Churches such as the Coptic Orthodox, Ethiopian Orthodox, Eritrean Orthodox, places a heavier emphasis on Old Testament teachings, and its followers adhere to certain practices such as observing days of ritual purification. Before praying, they wash their hands and face in order to be clean before and present their best to God. The Ethiopian Orthodox Tewahedo Church prescribes several kinds of hand washing for example after leaving the latrine, lavatory or bathhouse, or before prayer, or after eating a meal. The women in the Ethiopian Orthodox Tewahedo Church are prohibited from entering the church temple during menses; and the men do not enter a church the day after they have had intercourse with their wives.

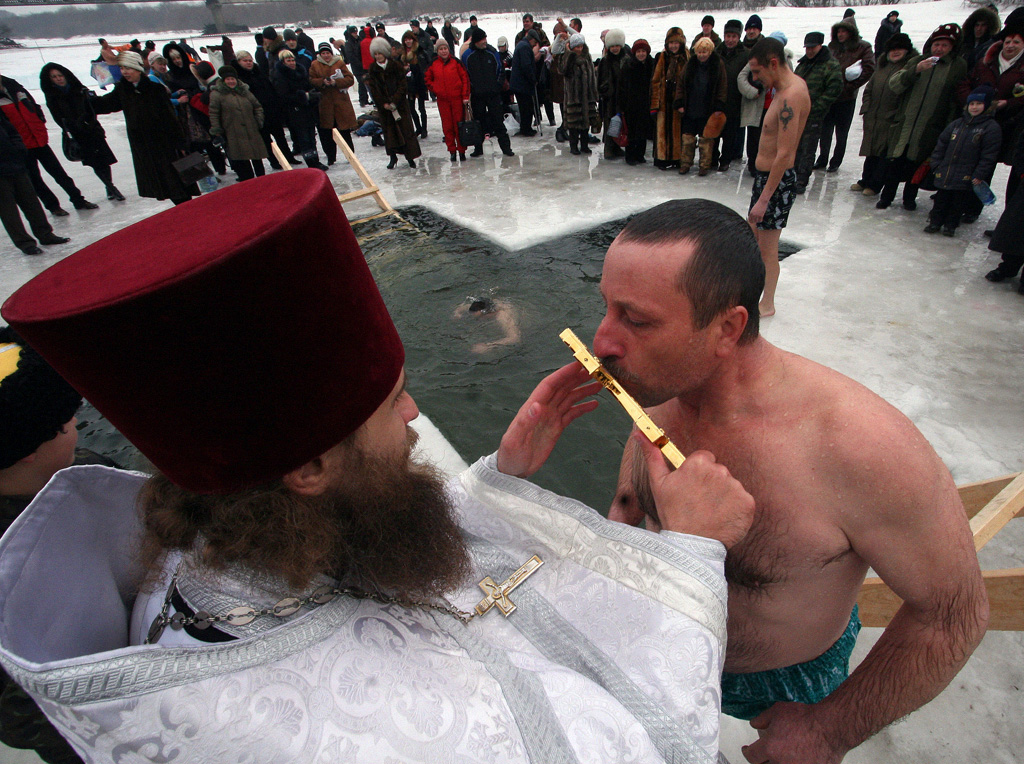
In traditionally Orthodox nations, water, baptismal rites and rituals of purification are typically central to Epiphany celebration

Roman Catholics, Eastern Orthodox, Lutherans and High church Anglicans are also traditionally required to regularly attend confession, as a form of ritual purification from sin, especially as preparation before receiving the Eucharist. For Catholics, this is required at least once a year and required for those who are guilty of unconfessed mortal sins.

In Reformed tradition, ritual purity is achieved through the Confession of Sins, and Assurance of Forgiveness, and Sanctification. Through the power of the Holy Spirit, believers offer their whole being and labor as a 'living sacrifice'; and cleanliness becomes a way of life (See Romans 12:1, and John 13:5–10 (the Washing of the Feet).

In Anabaptist Christianity (inclusive of Mennonites, Amish, Hutterites, Bruderhof, Schwarzenau Brethren, River Brethren and Apostolic Christians), footwashing is regularly practiced as an ordinance, in obedience to Jesus's command in John 13:1–17.

=== Washing before Christian prayer and worship ===
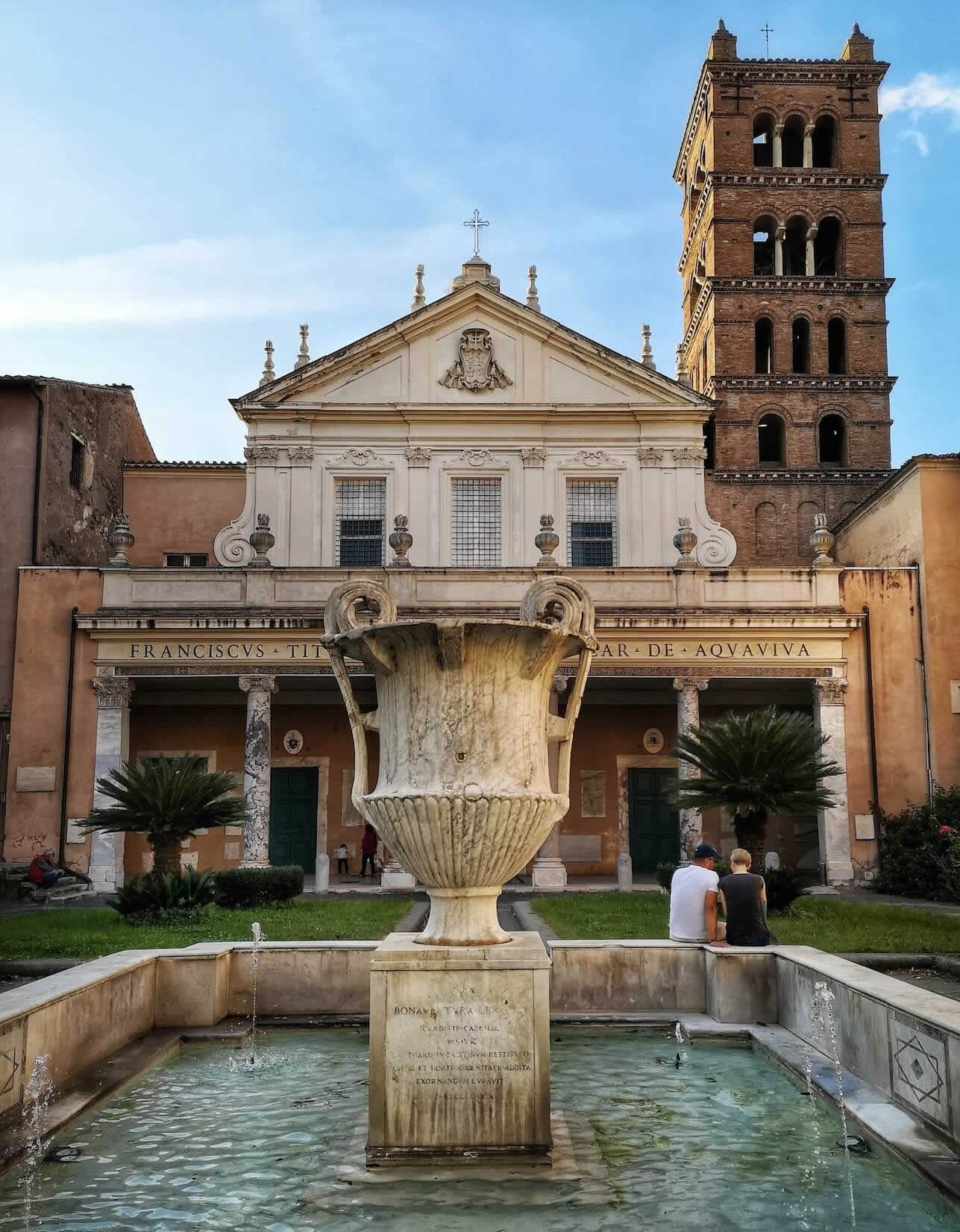
Cantharus of Santa Cecilia in Trastevere

The early Church practiced footwashing, in addition to the Holy Kiss, prior to reception of the Eucharist. The early Christian apologist Tertullian referenced a basin "of water for the saints' feet", and a "linen towel", used during their "imitation of the feetwashing performed by Christ." The early Church Father Clement of Alexandria linked the new sandals given by to Prodigal Son with feetwashing, describing "non-perishable shoes that are only fit to be worn by those who have had their feet washed by Jesus, the Teacher and Lord." The early Church thus saw footwashing to be connected to repentance, involving a spiritual cleansing by Jesus.

A cantharus is a fountain used by Christians for ablution before entering a church. These ablutions involve the washing of the hands, head, and feet. The cantharus is traditionally located in the exonarthex of the church. The water emitted by a cantharus is to be running water. The practice of ablutions before prayer and worship in Christianity symbolizes "separation from sins of the spirit and surrender to the Lord." Eusebius recorded this practice of canthari located in the courtyards of churches, for the faithful to wash themselves (especially the hands and feet) before entering a Christian house of worship. The practice has its origins Jewish practice of performing ablutions before entering into the presence of God (cf. Exodus 30:17–21). Though canthari are not as prevalent anymore in Western Christianity, they are found in Eastern Christian and Oriental Christian churches.

== History ==
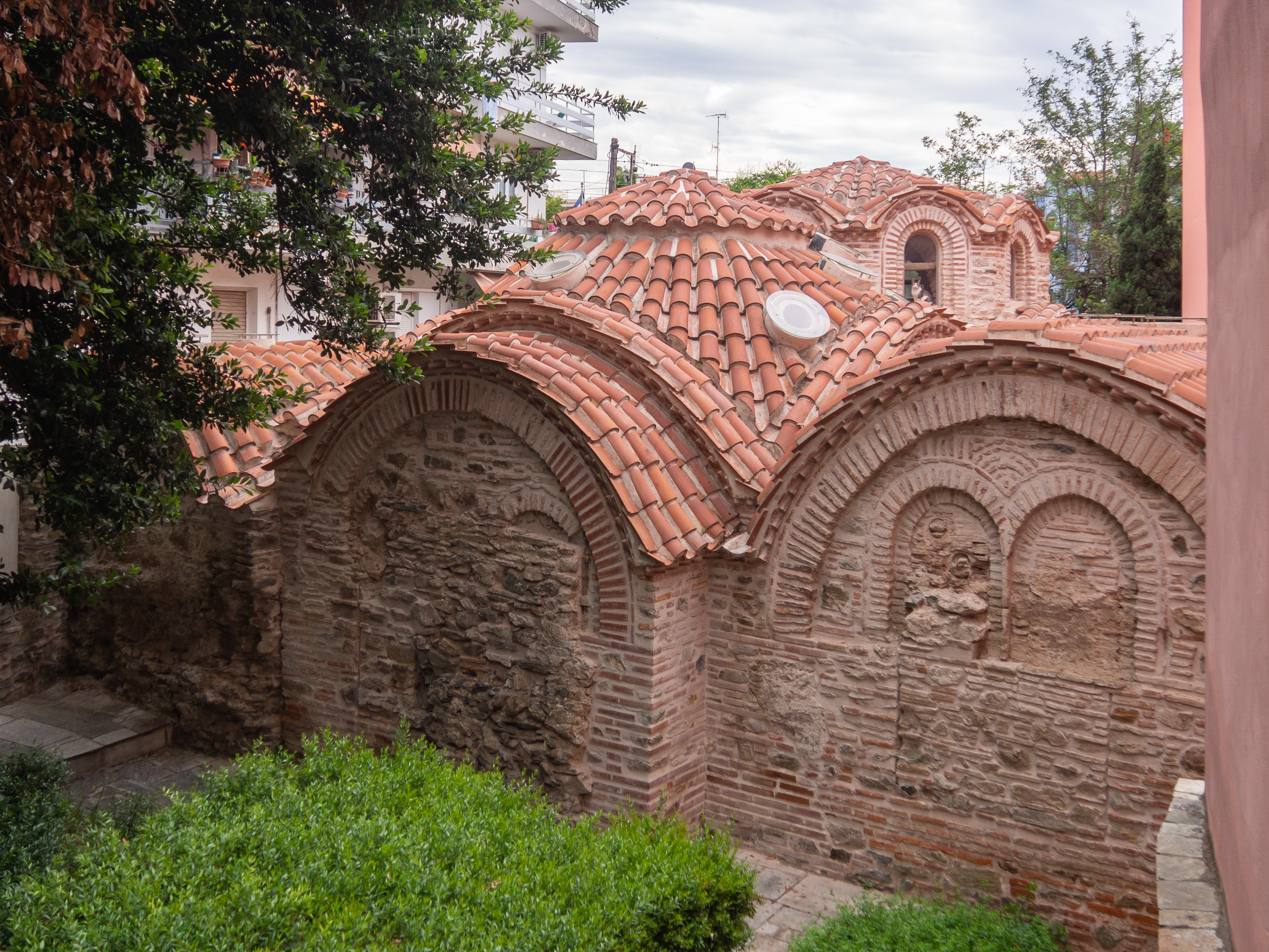
Byzantine Bath in Thessaloniki

Christianity has always placed a strong emphasis on hygiene, and water plays a role in the Christian rituals. The early Christian Church denounced the practice of mixed bathing in Roman pools, as well as the pagan custom of women naked bathing in front of men; as such the Didascalia Apostolorum, an early Christian manual, enjoined believing men and women to go to bathing facilities separated by gender, which contributed to hygiene and good health according to the Church Fathers, including Clement of Alexandria and Tertullian. The Church also built public bathing facilities that were separate for both sexes near monasteries and pilgrimage sites; also, the popes situated baths within church basilicas and monasteries since the early Middle Ages. Pope Gregory the Great urged his followers on value of bathing as a bodily need.

Great bathhouses were built in Byzantine centers such as Constantinople and Antioch, and the popes allocated to the Romans bathing through diaconia, or private Lateran baths, or even a myriad of monastic bath houses functioning in eighth and ninth centuries. Popes maintained their baths in their residences which described by scholar Paolo Squatriti as " luxurious baths", and bath houses including hot baths incorporated into Christian Church buildings or those of monasteries, which known as "charity baths" because they served both the clerics and needy poor people. Public bathing were common in medieval Christendom larger towns and cities such as Paris, Regensburg and Naples. Catholic religious orders of the Augustinians' and Benedictines' rules contained ritual purification, and inspired by Benedict of Nursia encouragement for the practice of therapeutic bathing; Benedictine monks played a role in the development and promotion of spas. Protestant Christianity also played a prominent role in the development of the British spas.

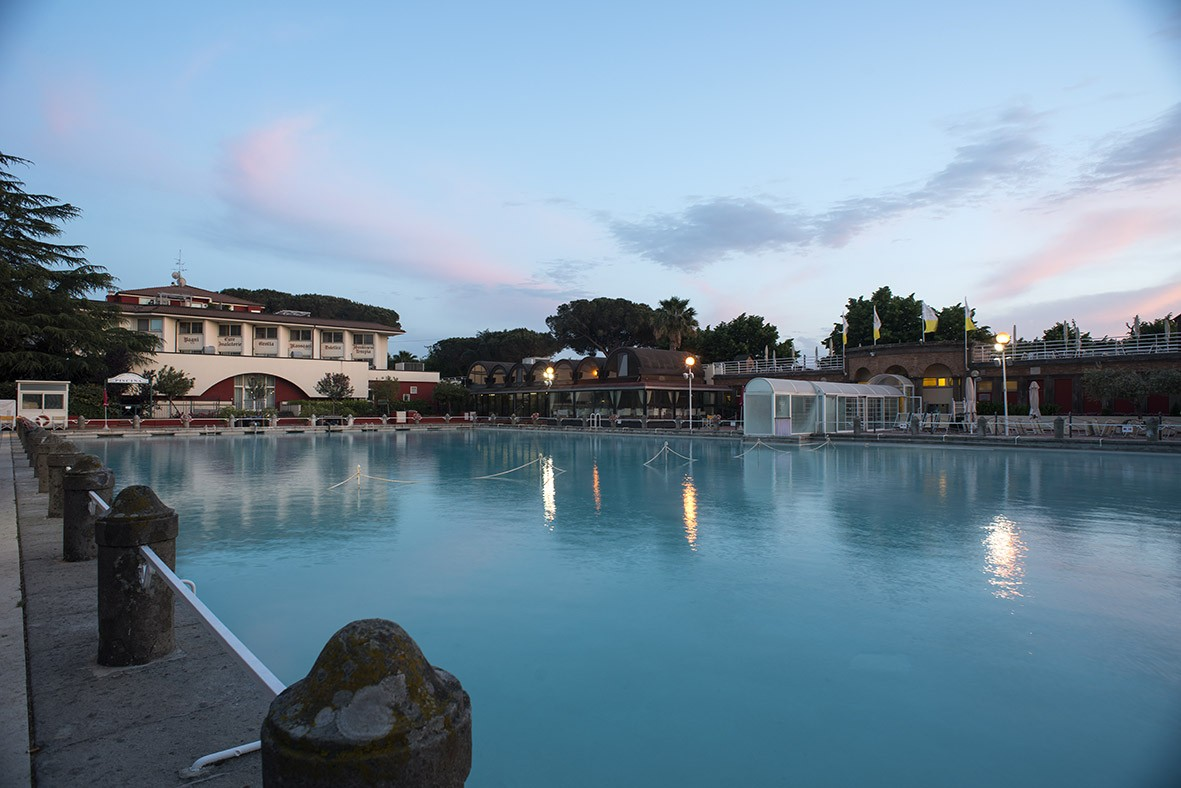
Bagno del Papa in Viterbo

In circa 1454 pope Nicholas V commissioned building a bath palace in Viterbo, and the construction at the Bagno del Papa was continued on through the reigns of several popes after Nicholas V. The Vatican accounts mention of payments "for building done at the bath palace of Viterbo" during the reigns of Calixtus III, Paul II, and Sixtus IV. There also is evidence Pope Pius II was responsible for the addition of a western wing to the building.

Contrary to popular belief bathing and sanitation were not lost in Europe with the collapse of the Roman Empire, as the spread of the Black Death made "Medieval people look for a link between health and hygiene". Soapmaking first became an established trade during the so-called "Dark Ages". The Romans used scented oils (mostly from Egypt), among other alternatives. By the 15th century, the manufacture of soap in the Christendom had become virtually industrialized, with sources in Antwerp, Castile, Marseille, Naples and Venice.

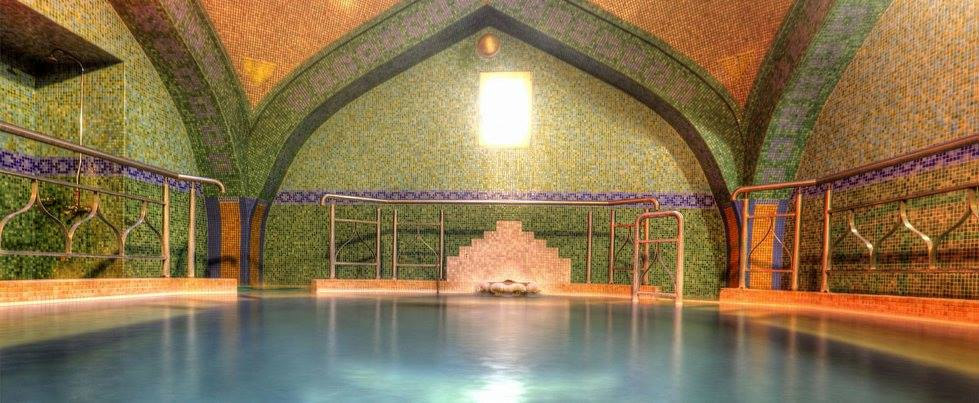
Agkistro Byzantine bath.

By the mid-19th century, the English urbanised middle classes had formed an ideology of cleanliness that ranked alongside typical Victorian concepts, such as Christianity, respectability and social progress. The Salvation Army has adopted movement of the deployment of the personal hygiene, and by providing personal hygiene products, such as a toothbrush, toothpaste, and soap. A major contribution of the Christian missionaries in Africa, China, Guatemala, India, Indonesia, Korea, and other places was better health care of the people through hygiene and introducing and distributing the soaps, and "cleanliness and hygiene became an important marker of being identified as a Christian".

Believing that on Epiphany day water becomes holy and is imbued with special powers, Eastern Orthodox cut holes in the ice of lakes and rivers, often in the shape of the cross, to bathe in the freezing water. Christianity strongly affected the development of holy wells in Europe and the Middle East, and its water are known for its healing properties.

The use of water in many Christian countries is due in part to the Biblical toilet etiquette which encourages washing after all instances of defecation. The bidet is common in predominantly Catholic countries where water is considered essential for anal cleansing, and in some traditionally Orthodox and Lutheran countries such as Greece and Finland respectively, where bidet showers are common.

== Eucharistic ablutions ==
=== Western Christian ===
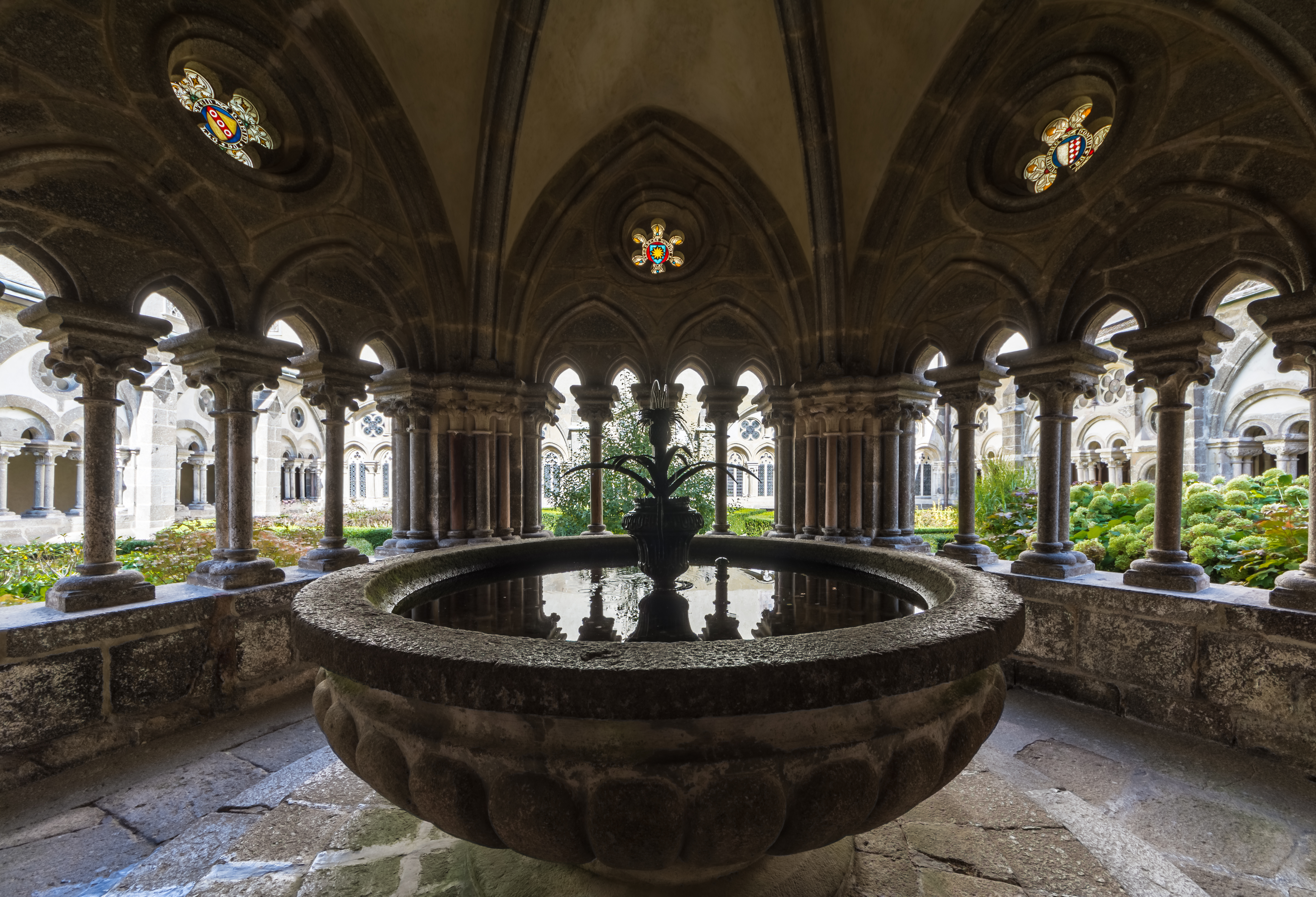
Fountain in the lavatorium of the Zwettl Abbey

In the Roman Rite, the celebrant washes his hands before vesting for Mass, but with another prayer (Da, Domine, virtutem). This is said privately in the vestry. He will then wash his hands again after the offertory—this is the ceremony that is known as the lavabo proper. This washing appears in both the Tridentine Mass, and in the Mass of Paul VI. The reason for this "second" washing of hands probably developed from the long ceremony of receiving the loaves and vessels of wine from the people at the offertory that was used in Rome. In the Gallican Rite the offerings were prepared before Mass began, as in the Eastern Liturgy of Preparation, so there was no long version of the offertory nor place for a lavabo before the Eucharistic Prayer. In the Middle Ages, the Roman Rite actually had two washing of hands, one before and one after the offertory. This first one has since disappeared, and the one which remains is the second.

In the Tridentine Mass, as well as in Lutheran Masses of Evangelical Catholic churchmanship and in Anglican Masses of Anglo-Catholic churchmanship, the term "ablutions" refers to when the priest rinses his hands first in wine and then in water following the Communion. It is to be distinguished from the lavabo, when the celebrant washes his hands with water only, reciting the words of Psalm 26:6–12 (KJV—in the Septuagint it is Psalm 25) at the offertory.

In the common Mass of Paul VI, the Lutheran Divine Service and the Anglican Eucharist the priest does not normally use wine to wash his hands at the ablution, although this is permitted, but only water.

=== Eastern and Oriental Christian ===
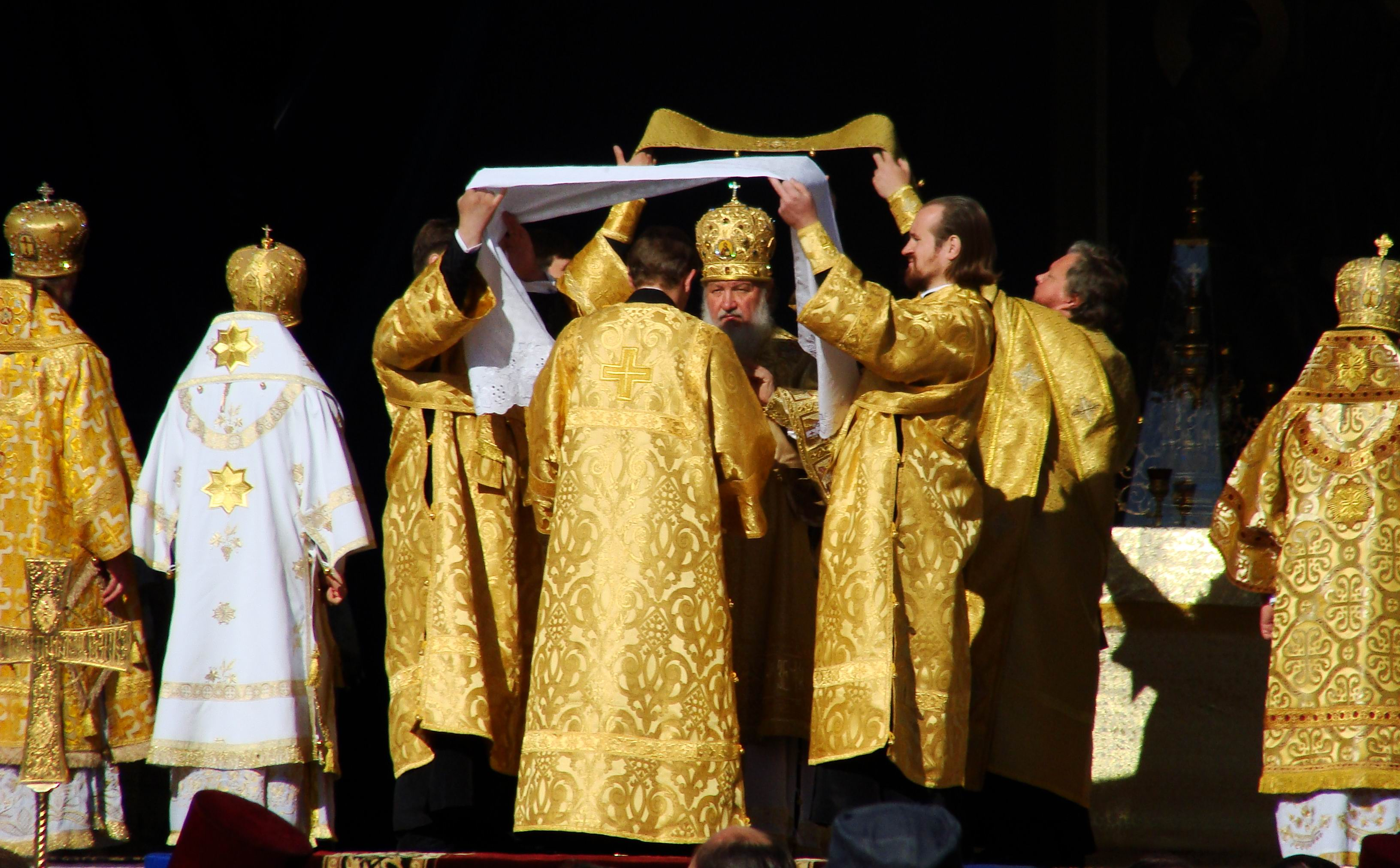
Patriarch Kirill I of Moscow washing his hands at the Great Entrance during an outdoor Divine Liturgy.

Prior to praying the canonical hours at seven fixed prayer times, Oriental Orthodox Christians wash their hands, face and feet (cf. Agpeya, Shehimo).

In the Eastern Orthodox and Greek-Catholic Churches, the term "ablution" refers to consuming the remainder of the Gifts (the Body and Blood of Christ) at the end of the Divine Liturgy. Holy Communion is always received in both Species (the Body and the Blood of Christ) not only by the clergy but also by the faithful. This is accomplished by placing the particles of the consecrated Lamb (bread) into the chalice, and distributing Communion to the faithful with a spoon. The portion which remains in the chalice afterwards must be consumed.

The ablutions will normally be performed by the deacon, but if no deacon is serving the priest will do them. After the Litany of Thanksgiving that follows Communion, the deacon will come into the sanctuary and kneel, placing his forehead on the Holy Table (Altar) and the priest will bless him to consume the Gifts, which is done at the Prothesis (Table of Oblation). First, using the liturgical spoon he will consume all of the Body and Blood of Christ which remain in the chalice. Then he will pour hot water on the diskos (paten), which is then poured into the chalice and consumed (this is to consume any particles that may remain on the diskos). Next the liturgical spear, spoon and chalice will be rinsed first with wine and then with hot water, which are then consumed. All of the sacred vessels are then wiped dry with a towel, wrapped in their cloth coverings and put away.

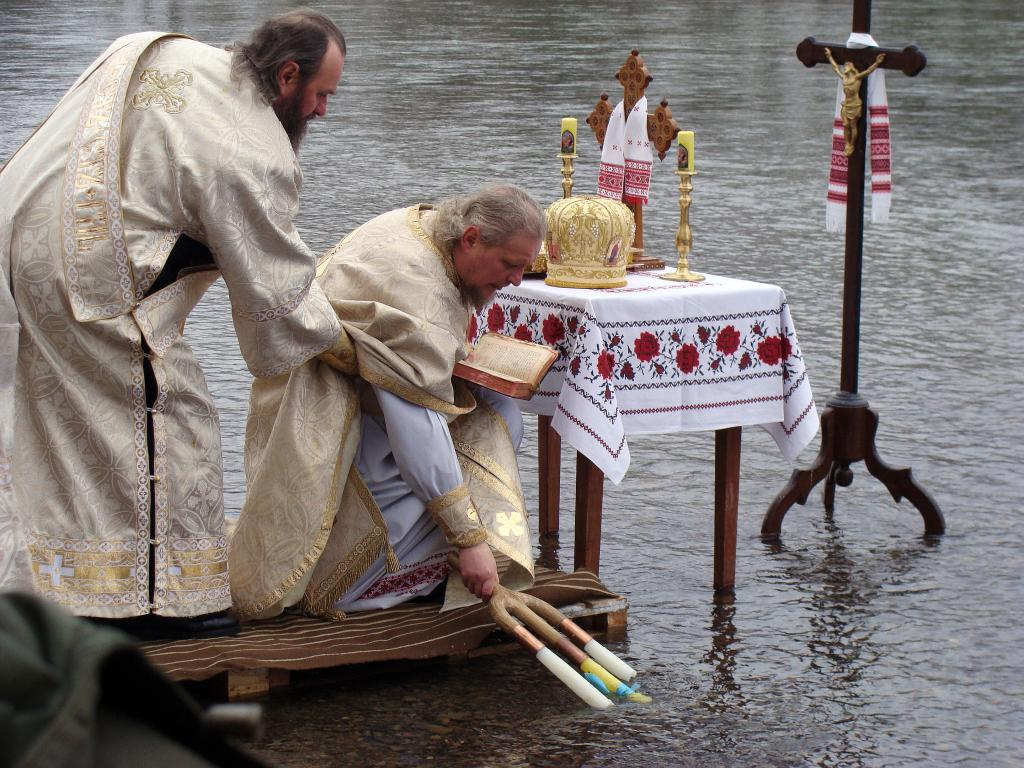
Great Blessing of Waters on the Sanok river on the Day of Theophany

Because the ablutions necessarily require consuming the Holy Mysteries (the Body and Blood of Christ), a priest or deacon may only perform them after having fully prepared himself through fasting and the lengthy Preparation for Holy Communion.

When a priest must take Holy Communion to the sick or homebound, if he has not prepared himself to receive the Holy Mysteries, he may ablute the chalice by pouring water into it and asking the one to whom he brought the Sacrament (or a Baptized child who because of their youth is not obliged to prepare for Communion) to consume the ablution.

If the Reserved Mysteries should become moldy, they must still be consumed in the same manner as the ablutions after Liturgy (normally, a fair amount of wine would be poured over them before consuming them, in order to soften and disinfect them). They should not be burned or buried. To prevent this, when the Mysteries are to be reserved for the sick, they should be thoroughly dried before being placed in the Tabernacle.

== Baptismal ablutions ==
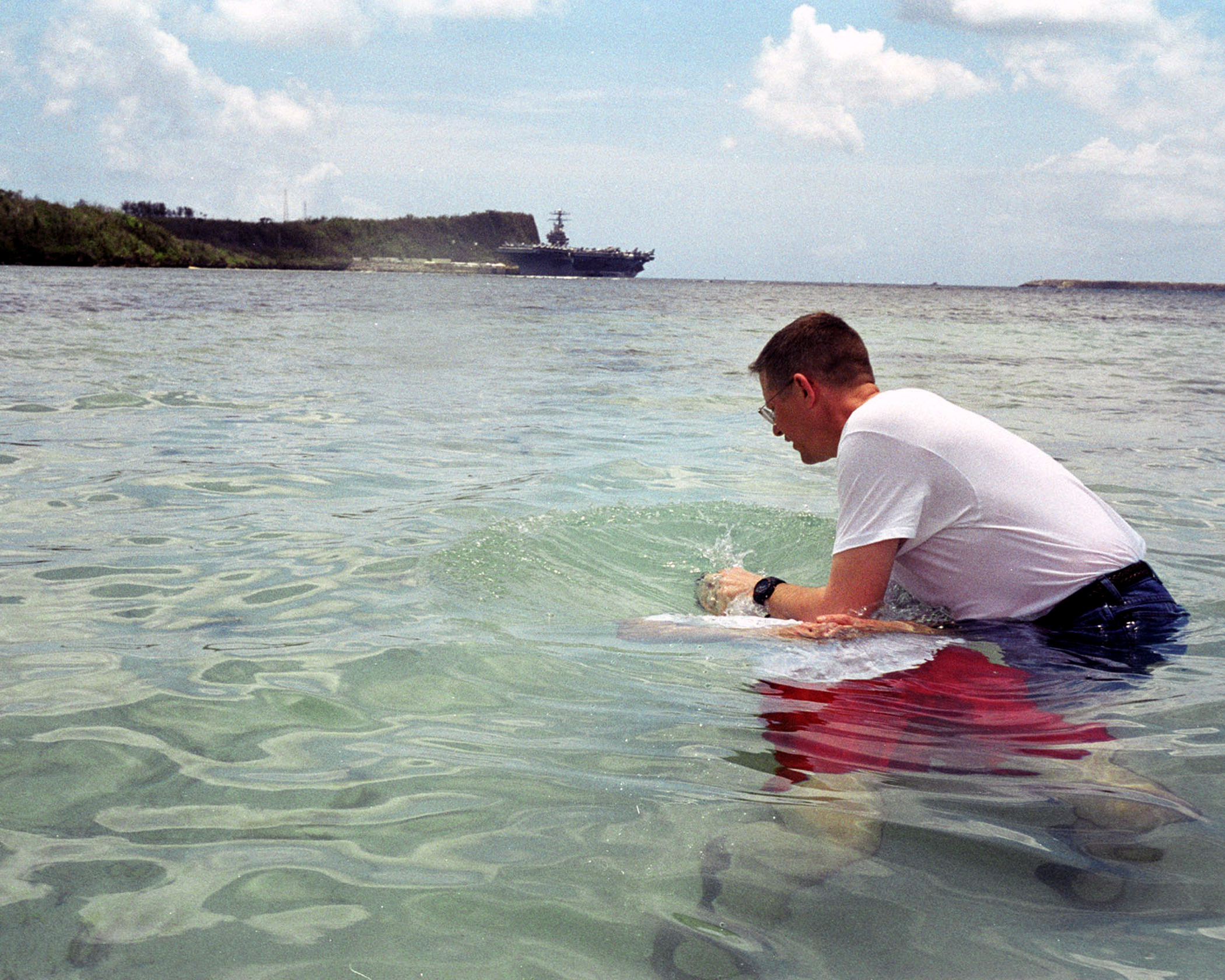
Baptismal ceremony on Easter Sunday

In Orthodox Christianity, there is also an ablution performed on the eighth day after Baptism. Immediately after being Baptized, every person, including an infant, is confirmed using the Mystery (Sacrament) of Chrismation. In the early church, the places where the person was anointed with Chrism were carefully bandaged, and were kept covered for eight days. During this period, the newly illumined (newly baptized person) would also wear his baptismal robe every day. At the end of the eight days, the priest would remove the bandages and baptismal garment and perform ablutions over him. While the bandaging no longer takes place, the ritual ablutions are still performed.

The newly illumined (newly baptized person) is brought back to the church by his Godparents for the ablutions. The priest stands him in the center of the church, in front of the Holy Doors, facing east. He loosens the belt of the baptismal robe and prays for him, that God may preserve the newly illumined in purity and illumine him by grace. He then dips a sponge in water and sprinkles him in the sign of the cross saying: "Thou art justified. Thou art illumined. Thou art sanctified. Thou art washed: in the name of the Father, and of the Son, and of the Holy Spirit. Amen." Then, as he says the next prayer, he washes each of the places where he had been anointed with Chrism. Next he performs the Tonsure, symbolic of the life of self-sacrifice a Christian must lead. In modern practice, these ablutions are performed at the end of the baptism service, after the first reception of Holy Communion.

== Washing of feet ==
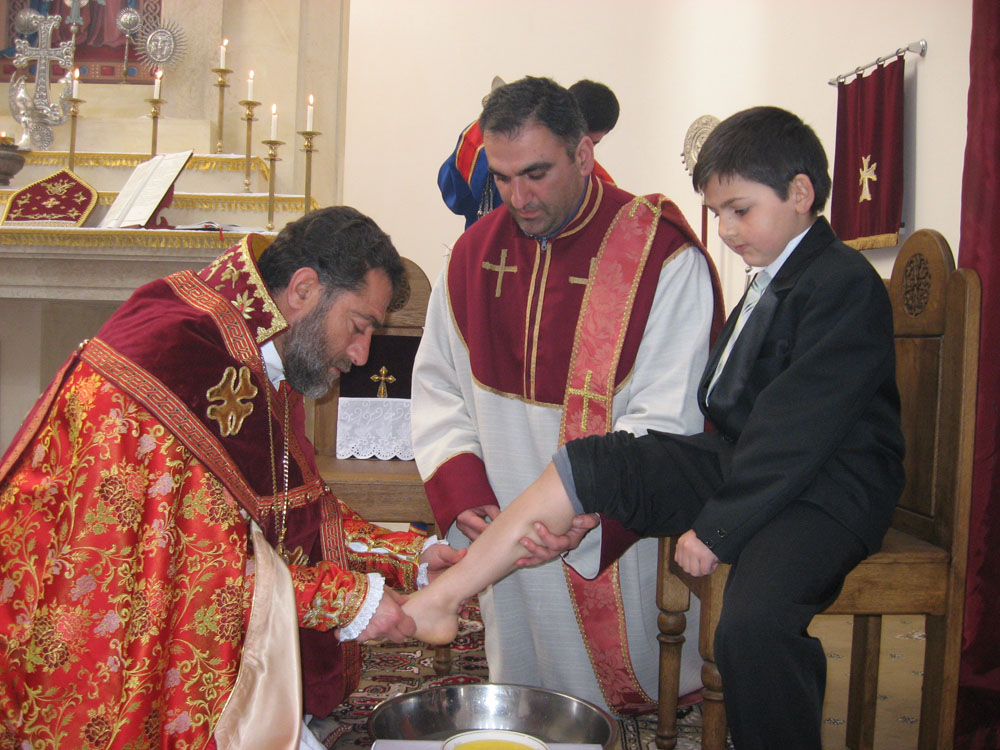
Bishop Sebouh Chouldjian of the Armenian Apostolic Church washing the feet of children

Many Christian churches practice a ceremony of the Washing of Feet, following the example of Jesus in the Gospel. Some interpret this as an ordinance which the church is obliged to practice, as with Anabaptist Christianity (inclusive of Mennonites, Amish, Hutterites, Bruderhof, Schwarzenau Brethren, River Brethren and Apostolic Christians).

St. Benedict of Nursia lays out in his Rule that the feet of visitors to the monastery should be washed, and also that those who are assigned to serve in the kitchen that week should wash the feet of all the brethren. At one time, most of the European monarchs also performed the Washing of Feet in their royal courts on Maundy Thursday, a practice continued by the Austro-Hungarian Emperor and the King of Spain up to the beginning of the 20th century (see Royal Maundy).

Foot washing is also observed by numerous traditions, including Anabaptists, Seventh-day Adventist, Pentecostal, and Radical Pietistic groups, and several types of Southern Baptists. Foot washing rites are also practiced by many Roman Catholic, Lutheran, Anglican and Methodist churches, whereby foot washing is most often experienced in connection with Maundy Thursday services and, sometimes, at ordination services where the Bishop may wash the feet of those who are to be ordained. Often in these services, the bishop will wash the feet of the clergy, and in monasteries the Abbot will wash the feet of the brethren. Though history shows that foot washing has at times been practiced in connection with baptism, and at times as a separate occasion, by far its most common practice has been in connection with the Lord's supper service. The Moravian Church practiced Foot Washing until 1818. There has been some revival of the practice as other liturgical churches have also rediscovered the practice.

== Ablutions for the dead ==
When an Orthodox Christian dies, their body is washed and dressed before burial. Although this custom is not considered to impose any sort of ritual purity, it is an important aspect of charitable care for the departed. Ideally, this should not be deferred to an undertaker, but should be performed by family members or friends of the deceased.

When an Orthodox priest or bishop dies, these ablutions and vesting are performed by the clergy, saying the same prayers for each vestment that are said when the departed bishop or priest vested for the Divine Liturgy. After the body of a Bishop is washed and vested, he is seated in a chair and the Dikirion and Trikirion are placed in his hands for the final time.

When an Orthodox monk dies, his body is washed and clothed in his monastic habit by brethren of his monastery. Two significant differences are that when his mantle is placed on him, its hem is torn to form bands, with which his body is bound (like Lazarus in the tomb), and his klobuk is placed on his head backwards, so that the monastic veil covers his face (to show that he had already died to the world, even before his physical death). When an Orthodox nun dies, the sisterhood of her convent performs the same ministrations for her as are done for monks.

In the Roman Catholic Church, the Absolute (or absolution of the dead) is a symbolic ablution of the deceased's body following the Requiem Mass. While specific prayers are said, the coffin is incensed and sprinkled with holy water. The absolution of the dead is only performed in context of the Tridentine Mass. Following the Second Vatican Council, the absolution of the dead was removed from the funeral liturgy of the Mass of Paul VI.

== Washing and anointing ==
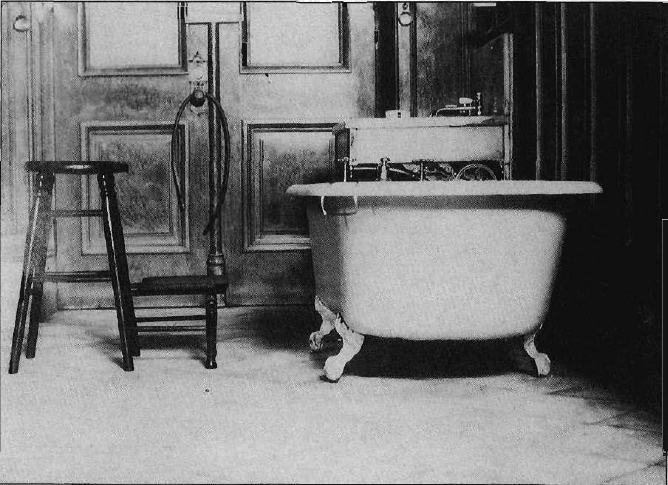
One of ten washing and anointing rooms of the Salt Lake Temple of the Church of Jesus Christ of Latter-day Saints circa 1911

Washing and anointing (also called the initiatory) is a temple ordinance practiced by the Church of Jesus Christ of Latter-day Saints (LDS Church) and Mormon fundamentalists as part of the faith's endowment ceremony. It is a purification ritual for adults, usually performed at least a year after baptism. The ordinance is performed by the authority of the Melchizedek priesthood by an officiator of the same sex as the participant.

In the ritual, a person is sprinkled with water to symbolically wash away the "blood and sins of this generation". After the washing, the person is then anointed to become a "king and priest" or a "queen and priestess" in the afterlife.

Once washed and anointed, the participant is dressed in the temple garment, a religious undergarment which the participant is instructed to wear throughout his or her life. (Since 2005, participants in the LDS Church version of the ritual already come clothed in this garment prior to the washing and anointing.) Finally, the participant is given a "new name" which he or she is instructed never to reveal except under certain conditions in the temple.

Mormons link the ritual to biblical washings and anointings. The temple garment symbolizes the skins of clothing given to Adam and Eve in the Garden of Eden, and the "new name" is linked to Revelation 2:17, which states that God will give those who overcome "a white stone with a new name written on it, known only to him who receives it".

== See also ==
- Baptism
- Baptismal font
- Baptistery
- Churching of women
- Hygiene in Christianity
- Lavabo
- Piscina
- Ritual washing in Judaism
- Tarping
- Washing and anointing

== Sources ==
- Buerger, David John (1987), "The Development of the Mormon Temple Endowment Ceremony" (PDF), Dialogue: A Journal of Mormon Thought, 20 (4): 76–122, doi:10.2307/45228107, JSTOR 45228107.
- Conybeare, Frederick Cornwallis (1911). "Ablution" . In Chisholm, Hugh (ed.). Encyclopædia Britannica. Vol. 1 (11th ed.). Cambridge University Press. pp. 65–66.
