= Lantheuil =

- Part of Ponts sur Seulles
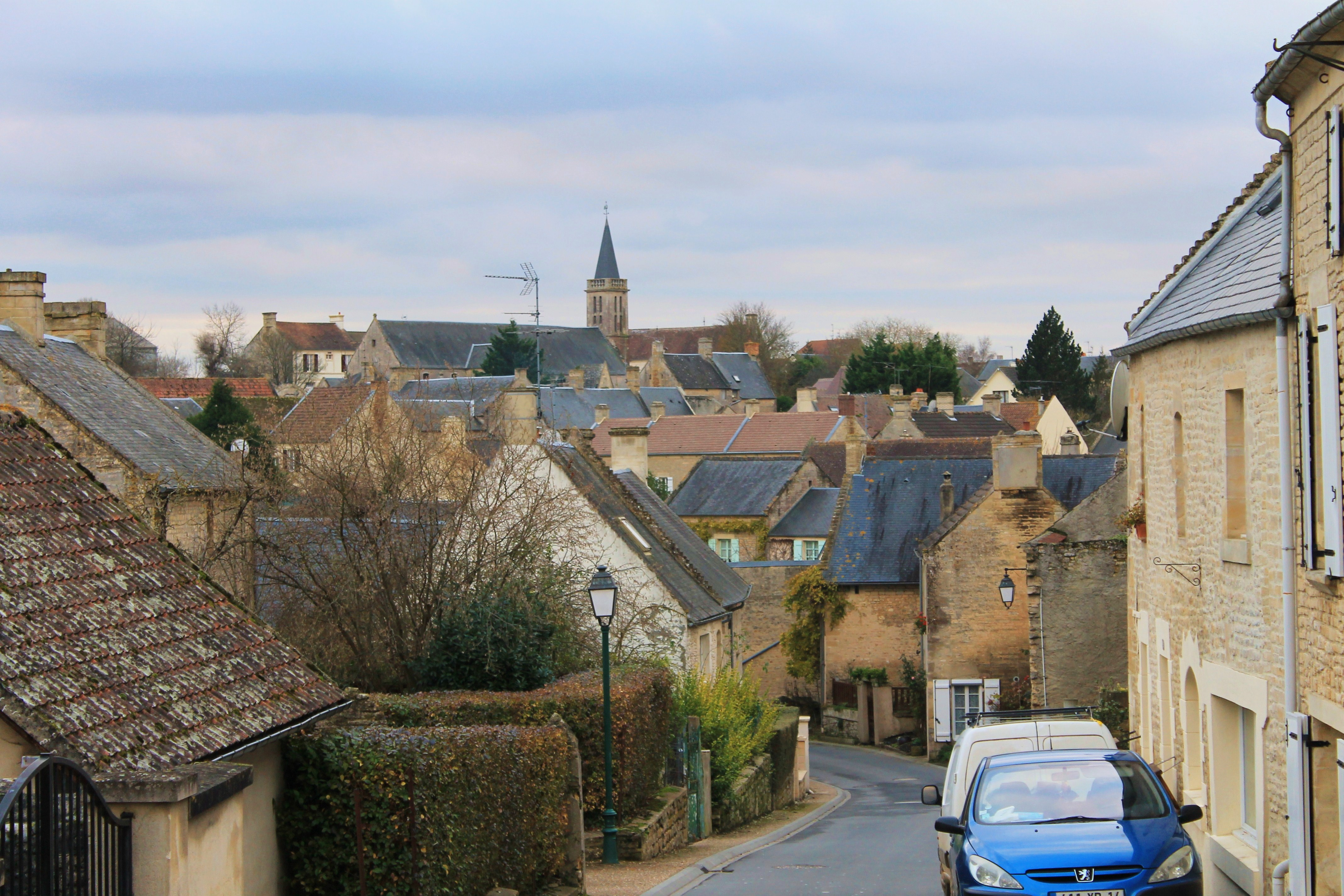
- Location of Lantheuil
- Location within France Location within Normandy
- Coordinates: 49°16′11″N 0°30′54″W
- Country: France
- Region: Normandy
- Department: Calvados
- Arrondissement: Caen
- Canton: Thue et Mue
- Commune: Ponts sur Seulles
- Area^{1}: 4.42 km^{2} (1.71 sq mi)
- Elevation: 30 m (98 ft)
- Highest elevation: 61 m (200 ft)
- Lowest elevation: 12 m (39 ft)
- Population (2018): 747
  - Density: 169/km^{2} (438/sq mi)
- Time zone: UTC+01:00 (CET)
  - Summer (DST): UTC+02:00 (CEST)
- Postal code: 14480
- ^{1} French Land Register data, which excludes lakes, ponds, glaciers > 1 km^{2} (0.386 sq mi or 247 acres) and river estuaries.

Lantheuil (French pronunciation: [lɑ̃tœj]) is a former commune in the Calvados department in the Normandy region in northwestern France. On 1 January 2017, it was merged into the new commune Ponts sur Seulles.

== Population ==
Historical population
Year	Pop.	±% p.a.
1962	345	—
1968	364	+0.90%
1975	352	−0.48%
1982	505	+5.29%
1990	616	+2.51%
1999	592	−0.44%
2018	747	+1.23%
Source: EHESS and INSEE

== See also ==
- Communes of the Calvados department
