= Tierceville =

- Part of Ponts sur Seulles
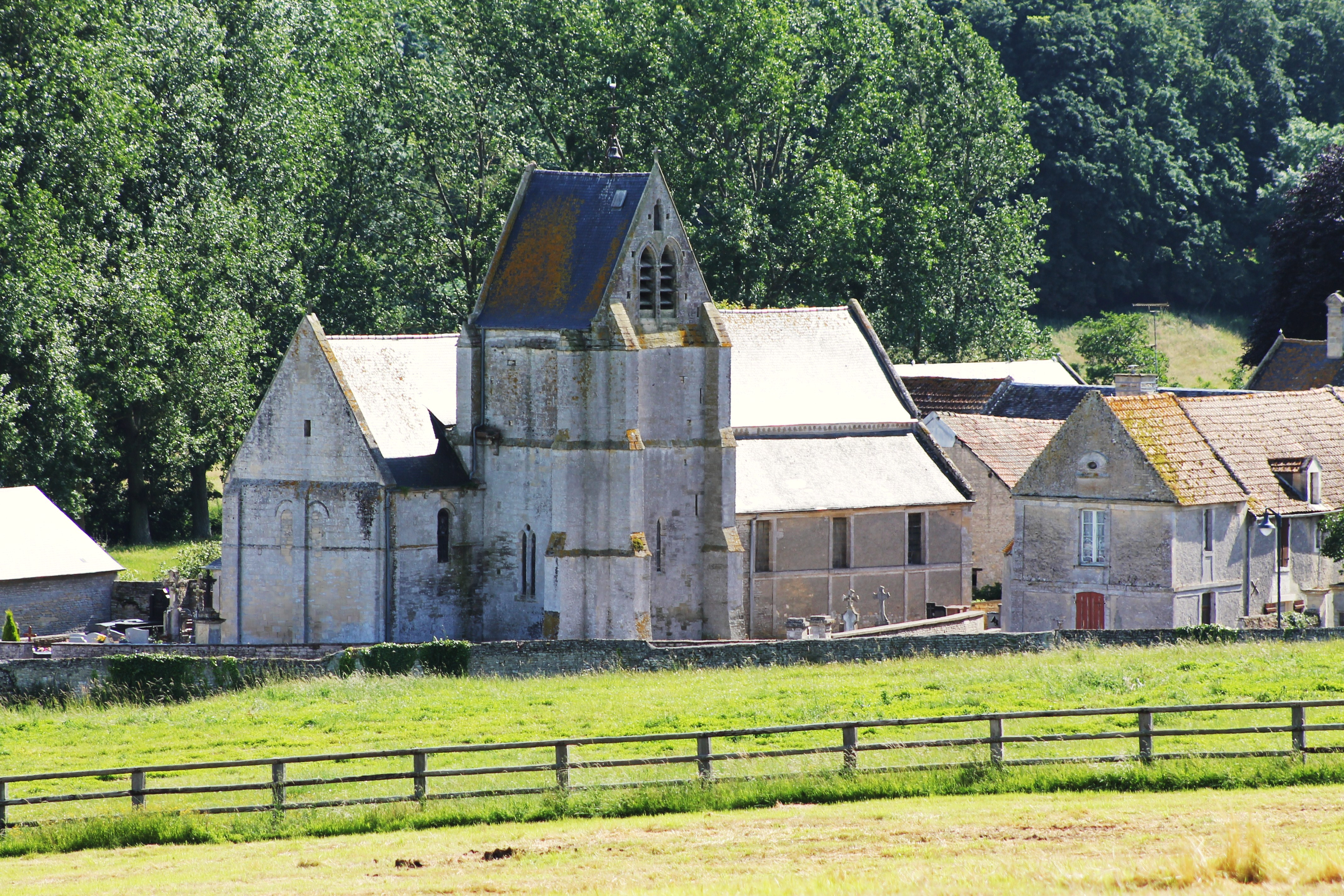

- Coat of arms
- Location of Tierceville
- Location within France Location within Normandy
- Coordinates: 49°17′38″N 0°31′49″W
- Country: France
- Region: Normandy
- Department: Calvados
- Arrondissement: Bayeux
- Canton: Thue et Mue
- Commune: Ponts sur Seulles
- Area^{1}: 2.62 km^{2} (1.01 sq mi)
- Elevation: 20 m (66 ft)
- Highest elevation: 59 m (194 ft)
- Lowest elevation: 7 m (23 ft)
- Population (2018): 157
  - Density: 59.9/km^{2} (155/sq mi)
- Time zone: UTC+01:00 (CET)
  - Summer (DST): UTC+02:00 (CEST)
- Postal code: 14480
- ^{1} French Land Register data, which excludes lakes, ponds, glaciers > 1 km^{2} (0.386 sq mi or 247 acres) and river estuaries.

Tierceville (French pronunciation: [tjɛʁsəvil]) is a former commune in the Calvados department in the Normandy region in northwestern France. On 1 January 2017, it was merged into the new commune Ponts sur Seulles.

== See also ==
- Communes of the Calvados department
