= Ponts sur Seulles =

- Commune
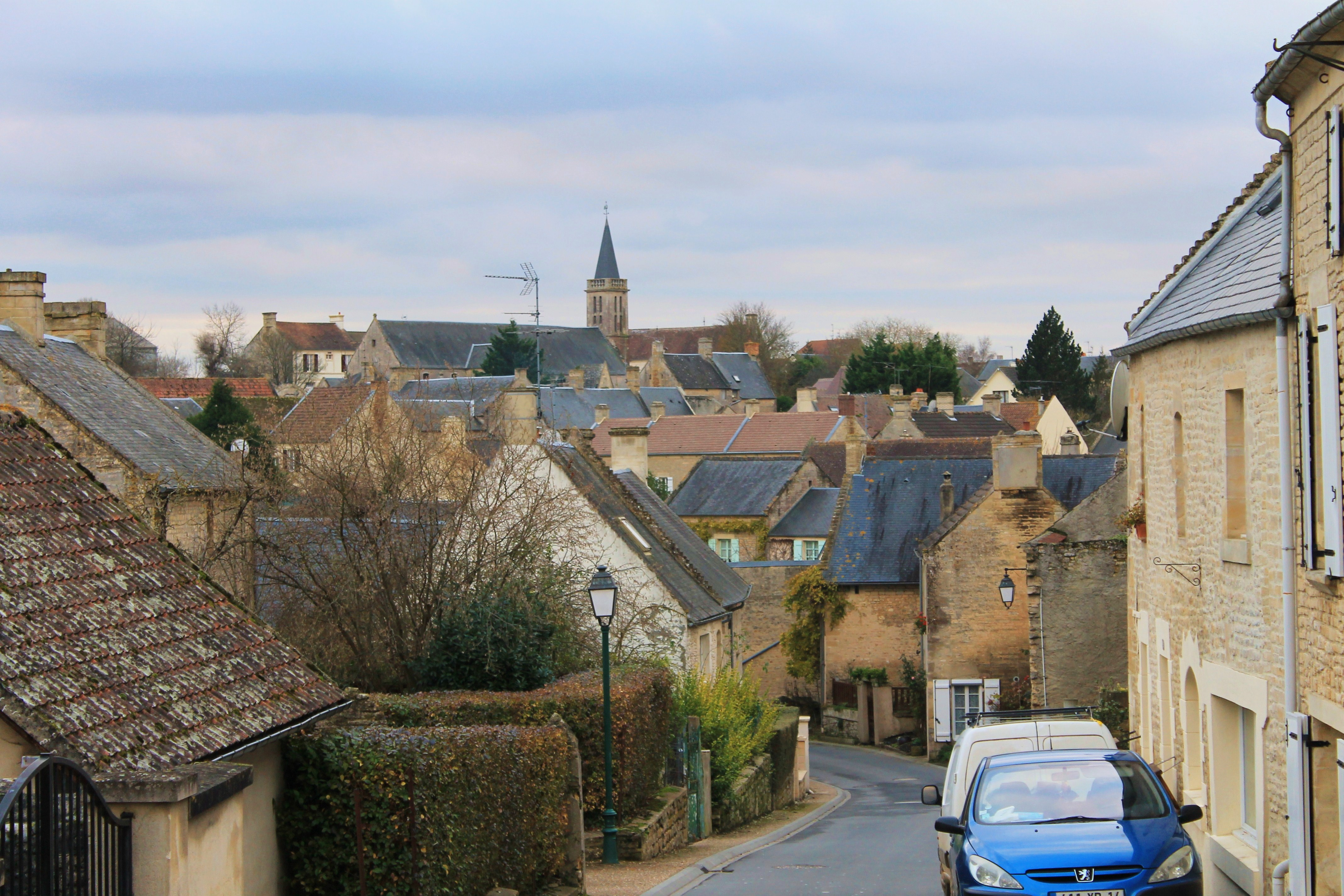
- A general view of Lantheuil
- Location of Ponts sur Seulles
- Location within France Location within Normandy
- Coordinates: 49°16′12″N 0°30′54″W
- Country: France
- Region: Normandy
- Department: Calvados
- Arrondissement: Bayeux
- Canton: Thue et Mue
- Intercommunality: CC Seulles Terre Mer

Government
  - Mayor (2020–2026): Gérard Leu
- Area^{1}: 12.86 km^{2} (4.97 sq mi)
- Population (2023): 1,212
  - Density: 94.25/km^{2} (244.1/sq mi)
- Time zone: UTC+01:00 (CET)
  - Summer (DST): UTC+02:00 (CEST)
- INSEE/Postal code: 14355 /14480
- ^{1} French Land Register data, which excludes lakes, ponds, glaciers > 1 km^{2} (0.386 sq mi or 247 acres) and river estuaries.

Ponts sur Seulles (French pronunciation: [pɔ̃ syʁ sœl], literally Bridges on Seulles) is a commune in the department of Calvados, northwestern France. The municipality was established on 1 January 2017 by merger of the former communes of Lantheuil (the seat), Amblie and Tierceville.

== See also ==
- Communes of the Calvados department
