= Amblie =

- Part of Ponts sur Seulles
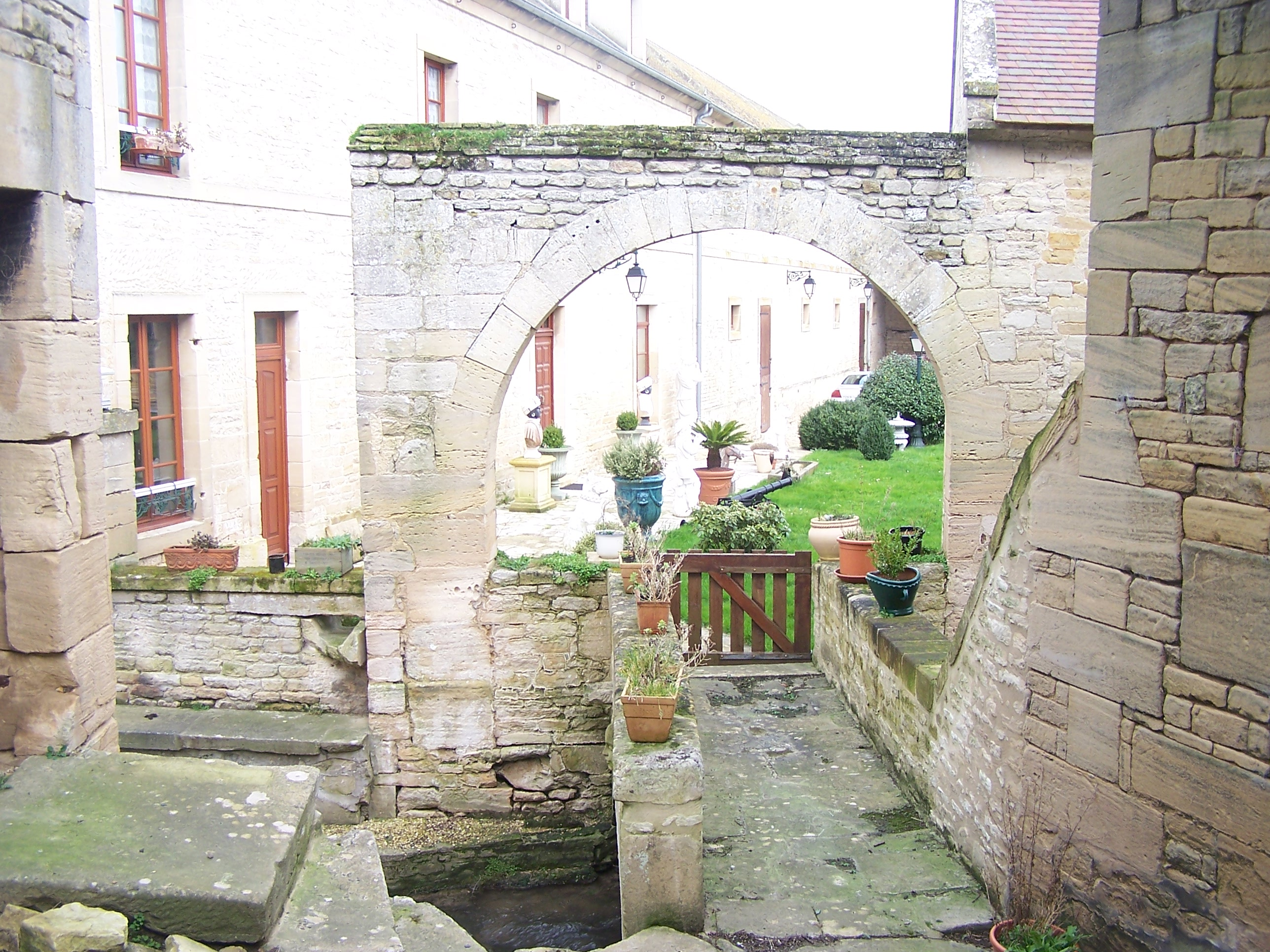
- Location of Amblie
- Location within France Location within Normandy
- Coordinates: 49°17′32″N 0°29′09″W
- Country: France
- Region: Normandy
- Department: Calvados
- Arrondissement: Caen
- Canton: Thue et Mue
- Commune: Ponts sur Seulles
- Area^{1}: 5.82 km^{2} (2.25 sq mi)
- Elevation: 25 m (82 ft)
- Highest elevation: 53 m (174 ft)
- Lowest elevation: 2 m (6.6 ft)
- Population (2018): 274
  - Density: 47.1/km^{2} (122/sq mi)
- Time zone: UTC+01:00 (CET)
  - Summer (DST): UTC+02:00 (CEST)
- Postal code: 14480
- ^{1} French Land Register data, which excludes lakes, ponds, glaciers > 1 km^{2} (0.386 sq mi or 247 acres) and river estuaries.

Amblie (French pronunciation: [ɑ̃bli]) is a former commune in the Calvados department in the Normandy region of northwestern France. On 1 January 2017, it was merged into the new commune Ponts sur Seulles.

== Geography ==
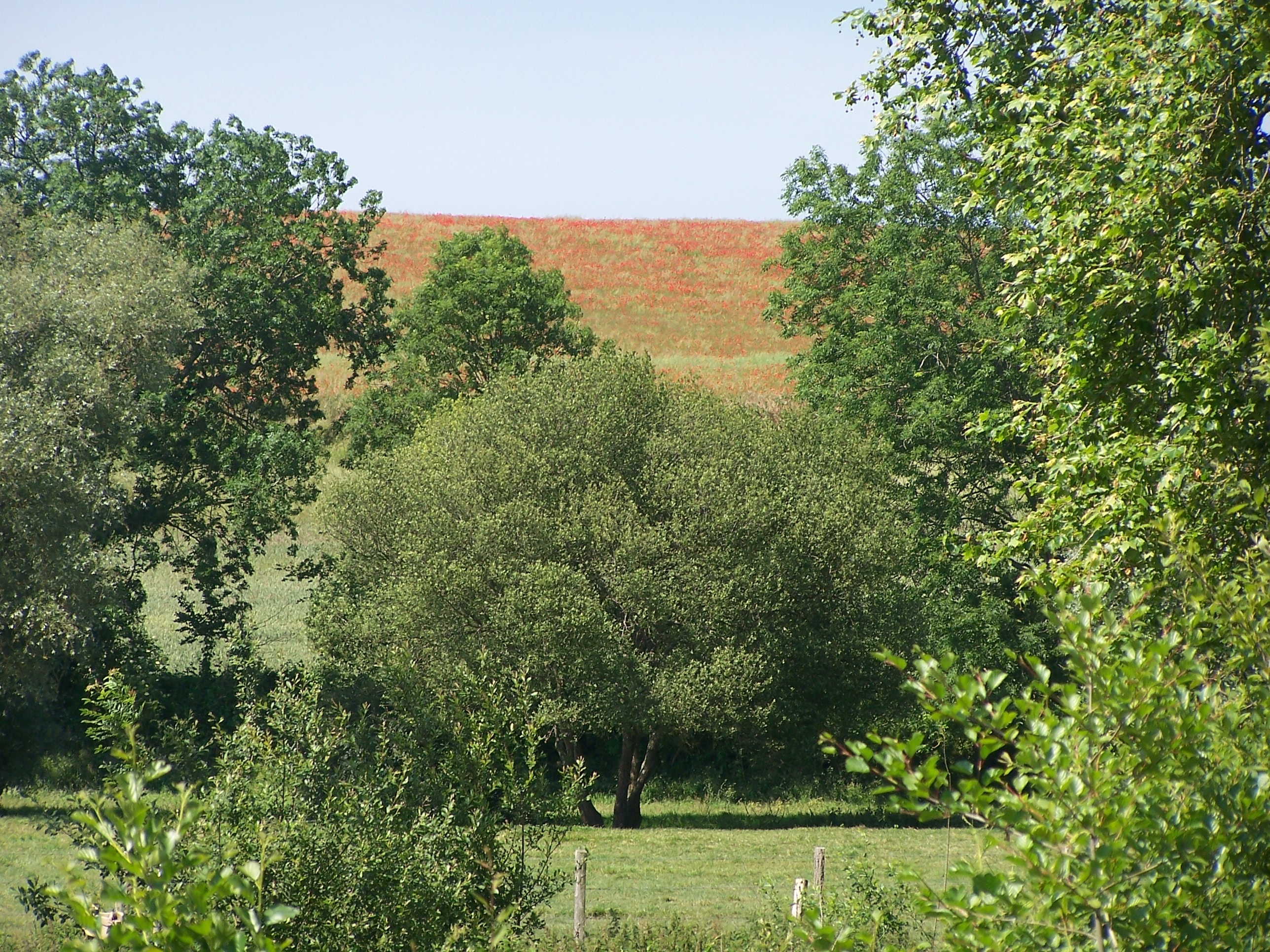
View of the Seulles Valley from the racetrack.

Amblie is located some 17 km north-west of Caen, 15 km north-east of Bayeux, and 5 km from the beaches of the Normandy landings in World War II. It is located in the middle of two valleys, those of the Thue and the Seulles, not far from the plain of Caen.

It can be accessed by the D22 road from Caen which passes through the south of the commune and continues to Creully. Access to the village is by the D35 road from Reviers in the north-east passing through the village and continuing south-west to Saint-Gabriel-Brecy. Apart from the village there are also the hamlets of Le Bout de Haut and Les Planches. Apart from a patch of forest in the west and small patches of forest at scattered points, the commune is entirely farmland.

The Seulles river forms the northern border of the commune flowing east then north to join the sea at Courseulles-sur-Mer. The Thue river flows from the south through the village to join the Seulles. The commune's floodplain (meadows and marshes), its light hillsides, and its agricultural plain provide it with rich agricultural production.

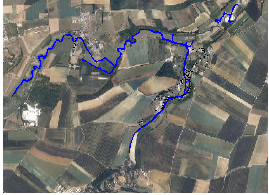
Amblie and its watercourses in satellite view: in the lower left the white point is the Amblie Orival quarry; the Seulles is on the left and the Thue a little more to the right

== Toponymy ==
The origin of the name may be from the Latin Amblia derived from Ambo Amnes meaning "two rivers".

== History ==
The origins of this small village, situated on the road of mills, are uncertain. The presence of man is old, however, as evidenced by human traces dating back to antiquity. For several centuries, the territory was attached to French nobility through two families, notable members of which were Achard de Bonvouloir and the Count of Buisson de Courson. The textile industry developed in the 19th century employing mostly women. The water mills established along the Thue operated until 1945 and treated threads for textiles as well as grain. The village, like many others, suffered severely from depopulation from the beginning of the 20th century. After the First World War Belgian farmers settled in the territory. Spared during the Second World War, even though it was very close to the landing beaches, the village assisted Caen by establishing a refugee centre for thousands of wounded victims. Integrated into the sphere of influence of Caen, the commune again suffered a rural exodus to the big city.

On 29 June 1944 the Canadian Red Ensign flew over the headquarters of the First Canadian Army near Amblie. For the first time in history the Canadian Armed Forces were fighting under their own colours.

This ceremony is depicted at the Juno Beach Centre where a flag is displayed showing the Canadian Red Ensign with, in the top left corner, the Union Jack, the flag of the United Kingdom formed by the superposition of the cross of St. George, St. Patrick and St. Andrew. It is hallmarked with a shield with the Canadian coat of arms which was created by King George V in 1924. The Red Ensign remained the national flag of Canada until 1965. It was then replaced by the red and white maple leaf Flag of Canada.

== Administration ==
List of Successive Mayors

From	To	Name	Party	Position
1983	2014	Jean-Pierre Lavisse	PS	General Counsel
2014	2017	Yves Beaudoin		

== Demography ==
The inhabitants of the commune are known as Ambliais or Ambliaises, alternatively Ambligeois or Ambligeoises in French.

Historical population

Year	Pop.	±% p.a.
1793	607	—
1800	583	−0.57%
1806	686	+2.75%
1821	611	−0.77%
1831	625	+0.23%
1836	660	+1.10%
1841	656	−0.12%
1846	663	+0.21%
1851	670	+0.21%
1856	653	−0.51%
1861	589	−2.04%
1866	573	−0.55%
1872	492	−2.51%
1876	474	−0.93%
1881	449	−1.08%
1886	428	−0.95%
1891	337	−4.67%
1896	304	−2.04%

Year	Pop.	±% p.a.
1901	295	−0.60%
1906	310	+1.00%
1911	290	−1.32%
1921	235	−2.08%
1926	259	+1.96%
1931	230	−2.35%
1936	230	+0.00%
1946	264	+1.39%
1954	305	+1.82%
1962	318	+0.52%
1968	267	−2.87%
1975	266	−0.05%
1982	276	+0.53%
1990	258	−0.84%
1999	292	+1.38%
2007	264	−1.25%
2012	272	+0.60%
2018	274	+0.12%

Source: EHESS and INSEE

== Culture and heritage ==
=== Civil heritage ===
- The Chateau des Planches (1785) is registered as an historical monument. In the 16th century the area belonged to the Planches family. In 1738 it passed by marriage to Buisson de Courson. From 1785 to 1789 (the years being inscribed on a chimney stack) Nicolas du Buisson de Courson built this castle to replace a dilapidated building. Simply decorated the new house consisted of a central building crowned by a triangular pediment on each side flanked by two pavilions.
- The Chateau of the Achard de Bonvouloir family. The main part was built in 1792 and the mid 19th century out of Creuilly limestone. The property belongs to the descendants of Achard, a contemporary of William the Conqueror. The castle, surrounded by a large park, is composed of a central pavilion topped by a triangular pediment and flanked by two wings at the front. During the Second World War a camp designed to accommodate thousands of injured people from the city of Caen was located in the building.
- There are two Fortified Farms in the commune:
  - The Bourg farm, called "Fiquet", in the style of the 16th century. This farm was extensively rebuilt in the 19th and 20th centuries.
  - The former Levallois farm from the 13th, 14th, 18th, and 19th centuries is a typical Norman farmhouse with its enclosed courtyard, dovecote, stables, bakery, its granary, charretteries, two porches from 1739 for the main porch and 1710 for the porch leading to the fields formerly facing Bonvouloir Castle. In the main body of the house are traces of architectural features such as two sinks in puisette style from the 13th and 14th centuries with its western gable, and a tower with a spiral staircase typical of the Middle Ages which was once part of a stately home very altered in the 19th century. To the north of the main house are the Thue and Seulles rivers, near the Mill de la Porte which had two wheels. During the Normandy landings the mill housed the headquarters of the First Canadian Army commanded by General Harry Crerar.
  - The Chateau Farm from the 19th century called the Fiquet Vallerande farm. An architectural landmark for the region because of the Maine Anjou style.
- Several Mills in the commune (without mill wheels). Located on the road of the mills, in the 19th century the village had a dozen mills distributed along the Thue. These establishments played an important role in industry and were mainly grain mills in this region, or pressing textiles, as at Cully.
- The Seulles and Thue Valleys (the two rivers bordering the commune).
- The Marettes Nature Garden, a garden for associative learning for vegetable garden cultivation.
- The old Press in the area of the Bonvouloir family castle. A building in the medieval style dating from approximately the 15th or 16th centuries or possibly earlier - it was at one time the press for the village - its cider tower and Wine press can still be seen.
- The old Pedestrian Bridge (1743) made of Creuilly limestone (300X200X400). Located just after the last Amblie mill, this bridge spans the Seulles river. The second arm of the river is crossed by a footbridge. The bridge was used by cows grazing on the other side of the river. After its deterioration from this usage it was restored after the construction of a ford downstream for the passage of livestock.
- The Orival Stone Quarry (Merovingian). In this open-air quarry stone called Orival Quarry Tile is extracted. This stone is very coarse grained and is more resistant to frost than Caen stone. Quarrying from the Merovingian strata is important economically for several communes. Traces of ancient lime kilns testify to this. In the 11th and 12th centuries tile Orival Quarry tiles were used in the construction of monuments such as Bayeux Cathedral. These quarries were mentioned for the first time in 1692 in the land rents for Fécamp Abbey. Stone has been extracted continuously from the 19th century until the 21st century and is exported to large distances.
- The Menhir of Planches.

=== Religious heritage ===
- The Church (13th century) is registered as an historical monument. This church bears the marks of many rebuilds. The Romanesque nave from the 12th century, as evidenced by the Gadrooning, is retained one aisle. The western facade was redone in the 13th century. In the 19th century a tower replaced a small steeple from the 16th century based on the archway separating the choir from the nave. The early vaulted choir was partly reworked and a side chapel has been removed. Only the five-arched opening on the north aisle are Romanesque. Some of the sculptures are fanciful figures: such as an outsized man's head or people being bitten by mysterious animals, resulting from workshop jokes typical of Romanesque style. The portal on the western facade is from the 13th century. It is surrounded by a Torus decorated with rings. The presence of this motif is rare, occurring in very few places in France.

=== Picture Gallery ===
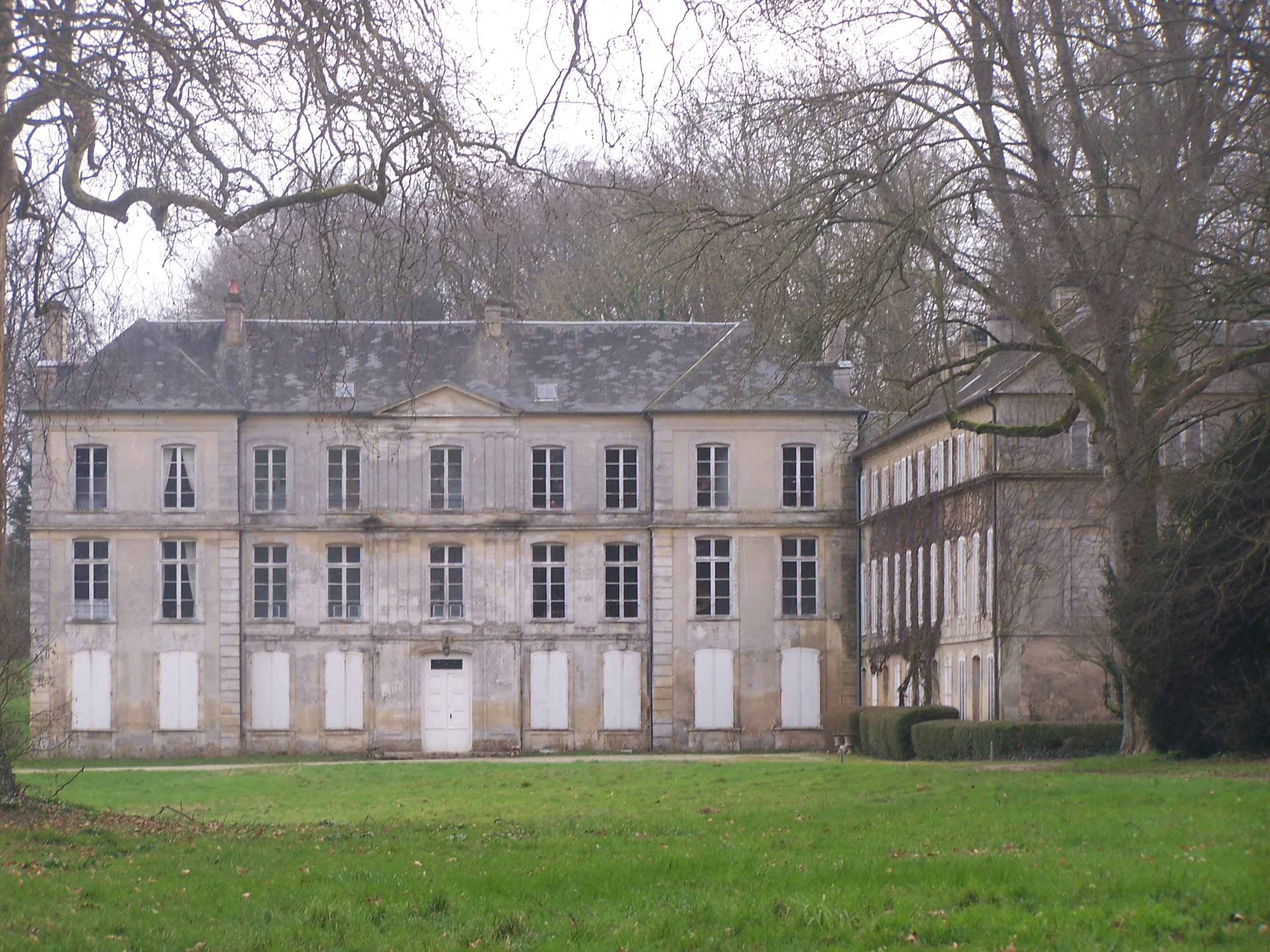
The Chateau de la Bonvouloir

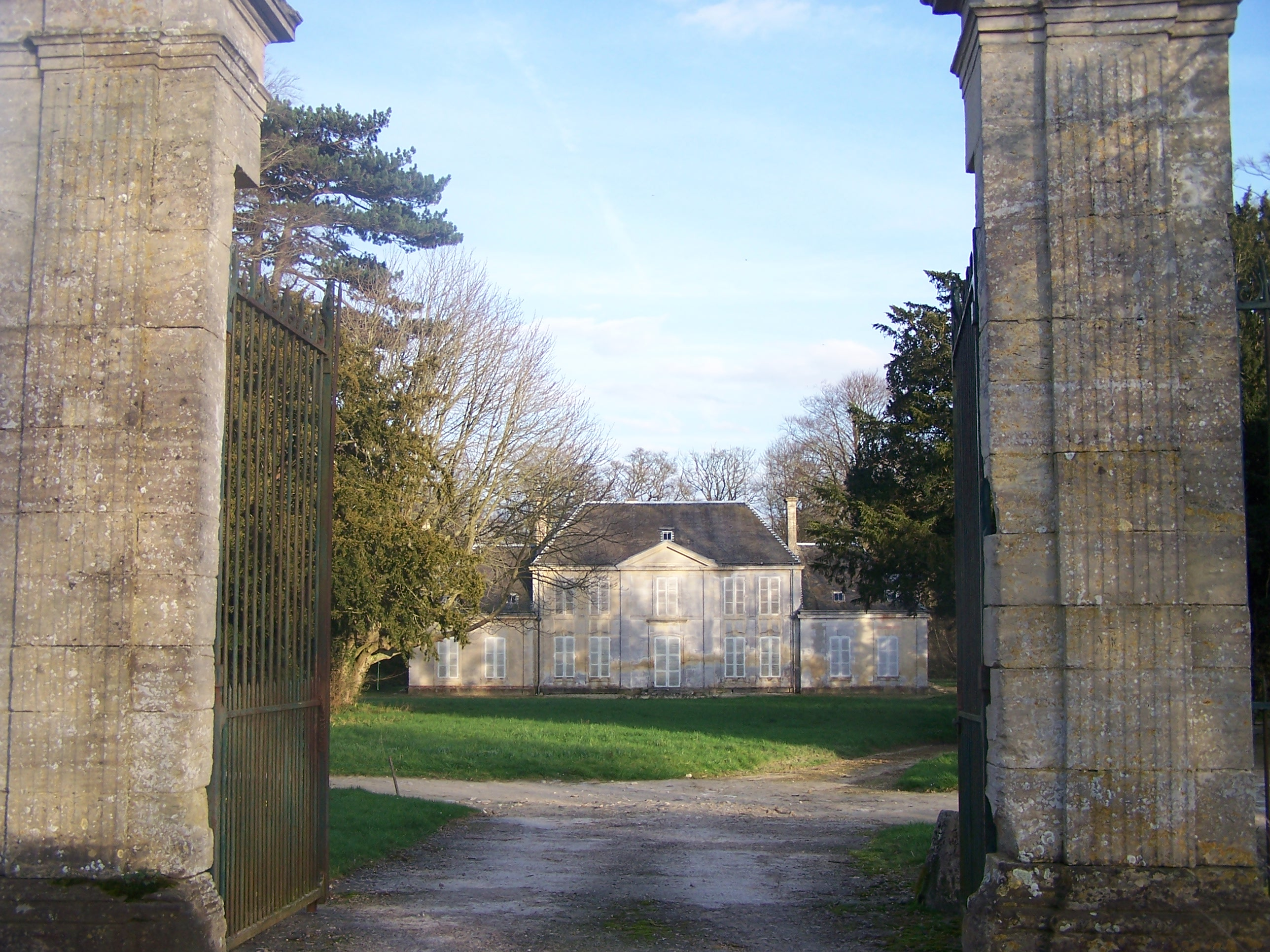
The Château des Planches of the Buisson de Courson family

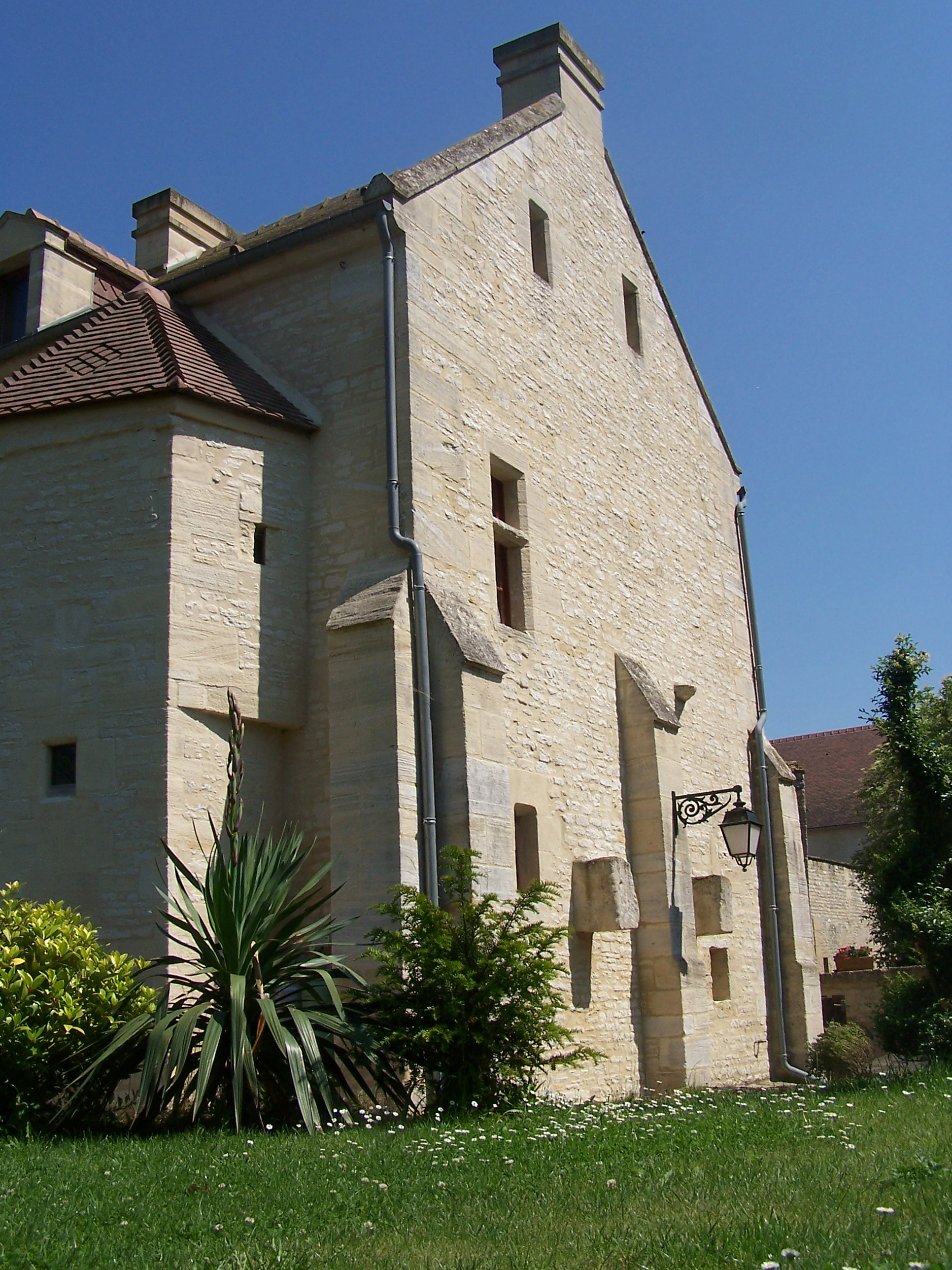
Western gable end of the lordly manor of Amblie

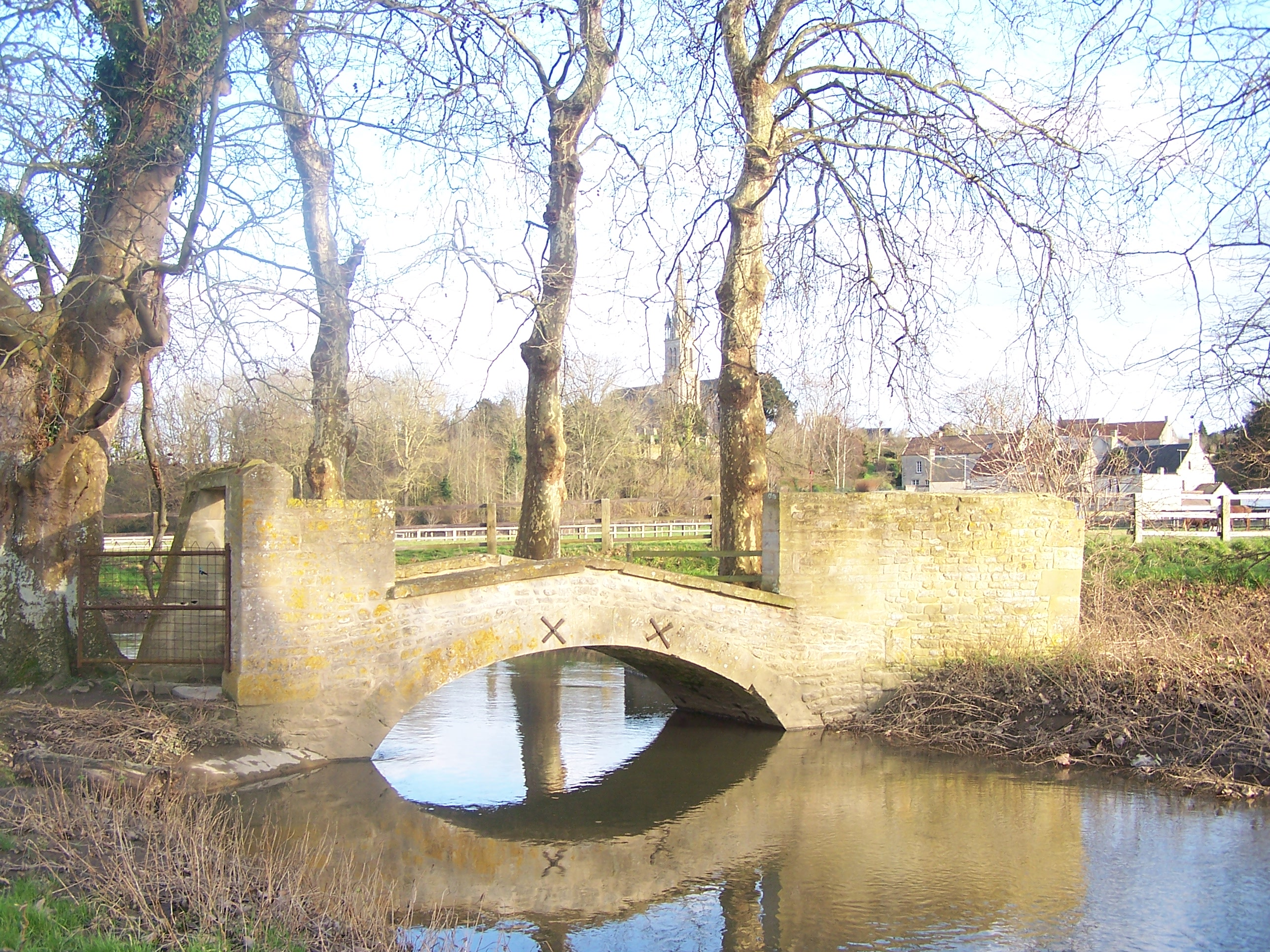
View along the Seulles river

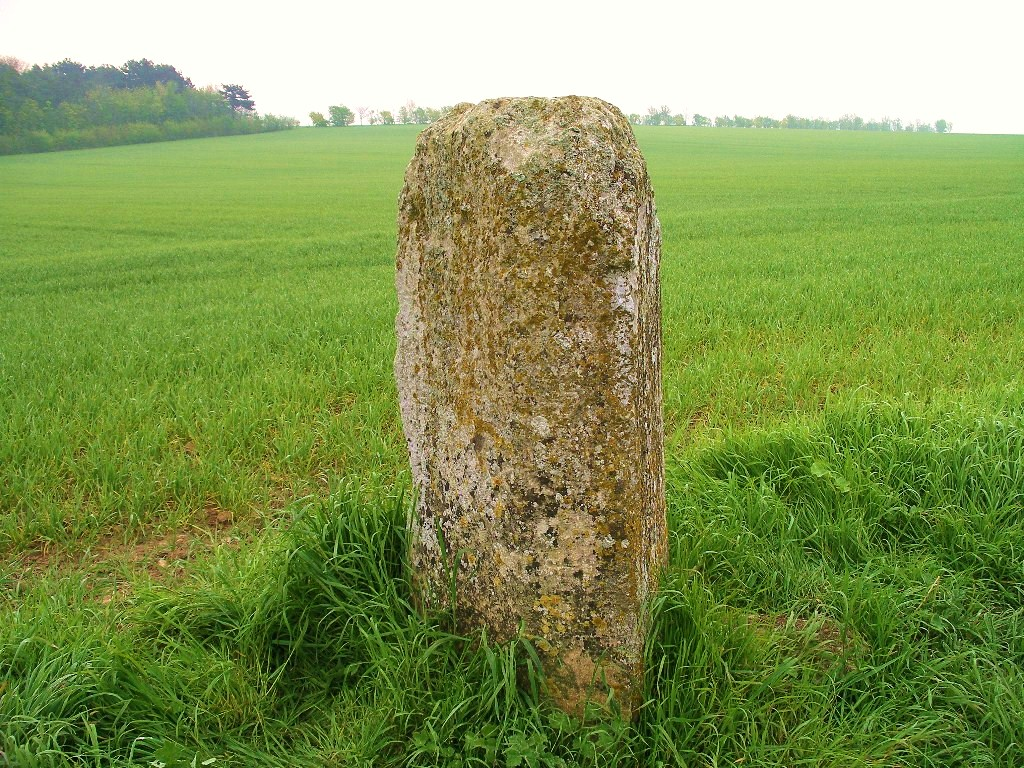
The Menhir

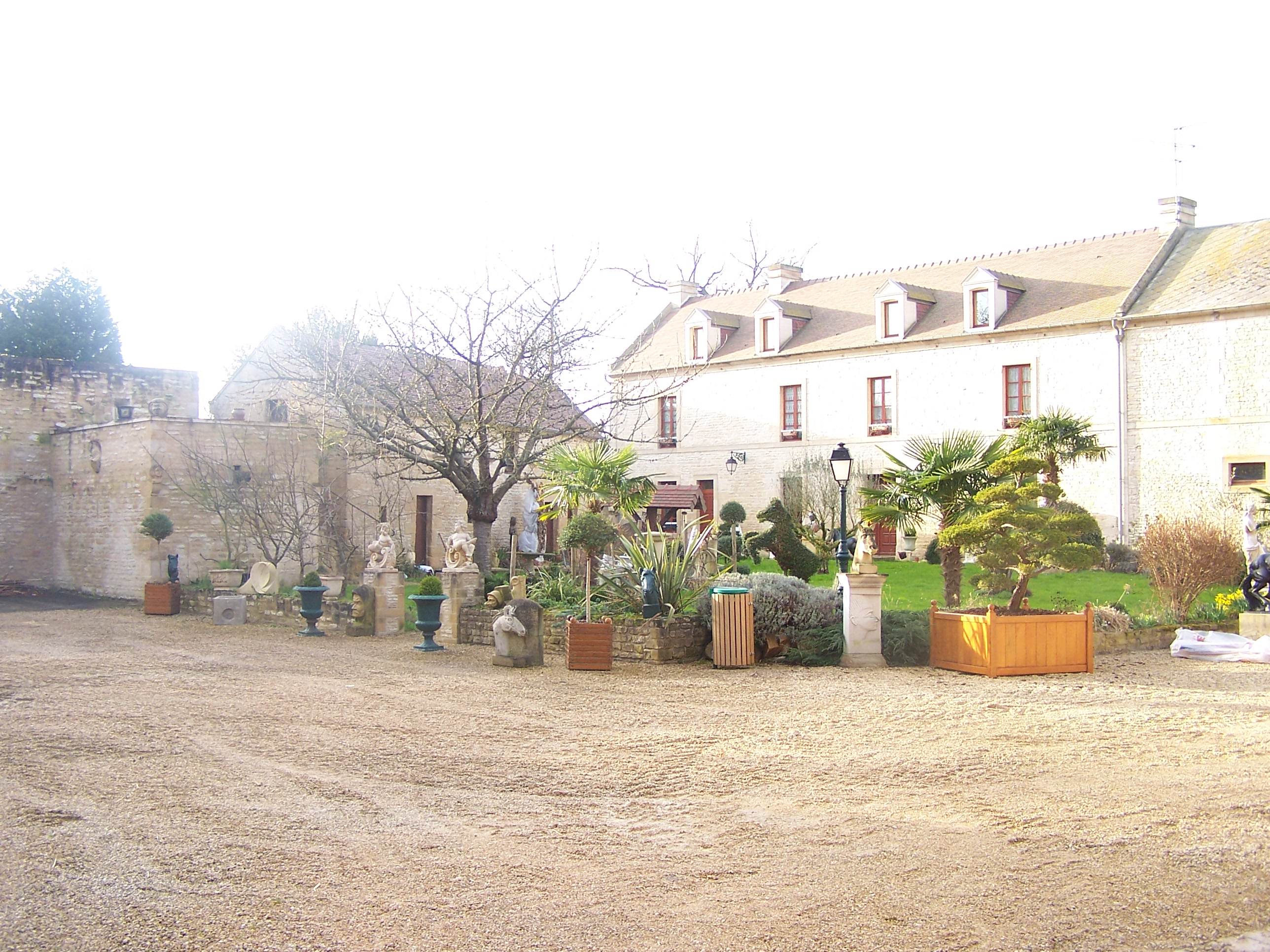
The Levallois farm

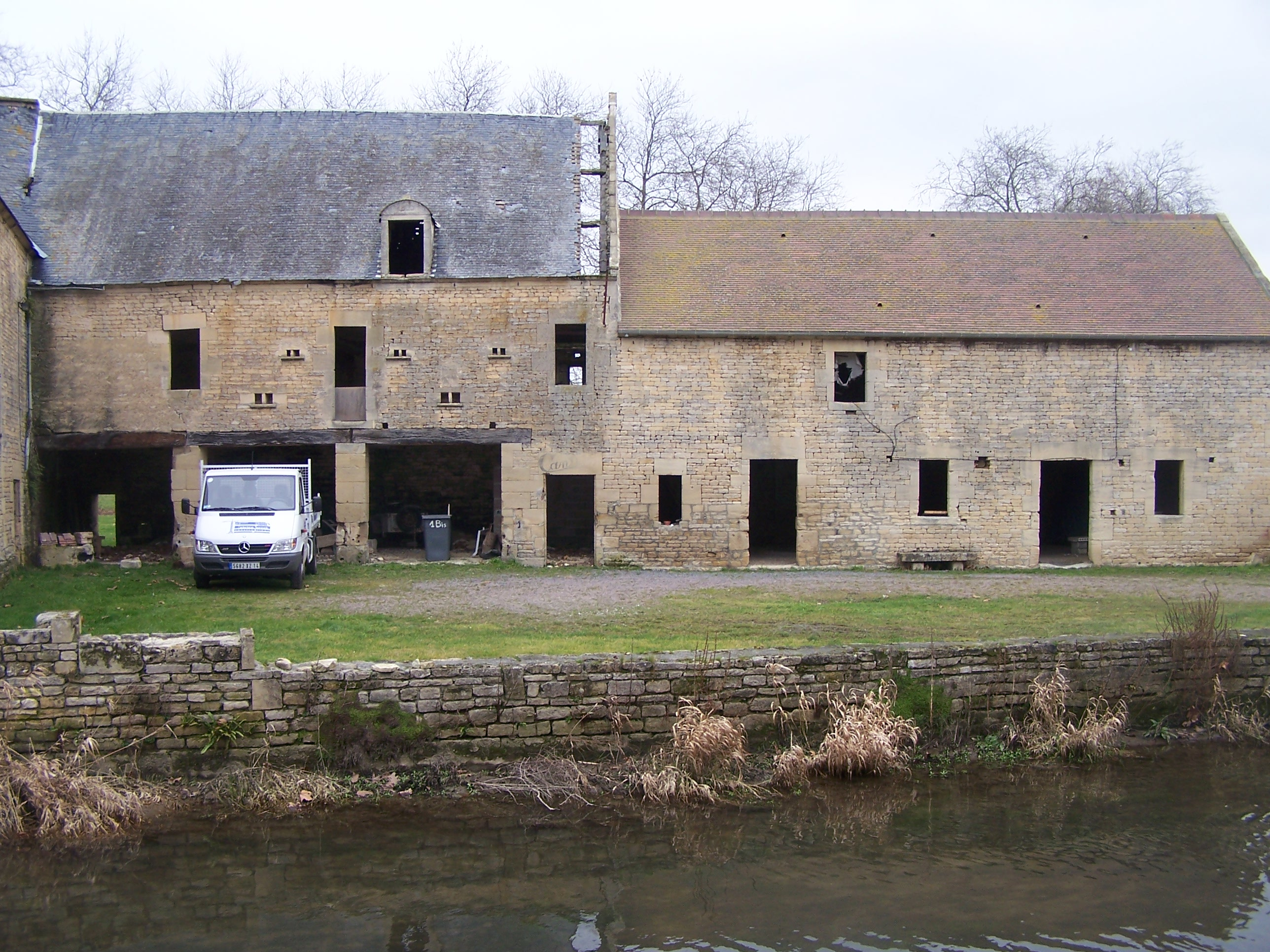
An old mill: formerly a canteen for the Canadians

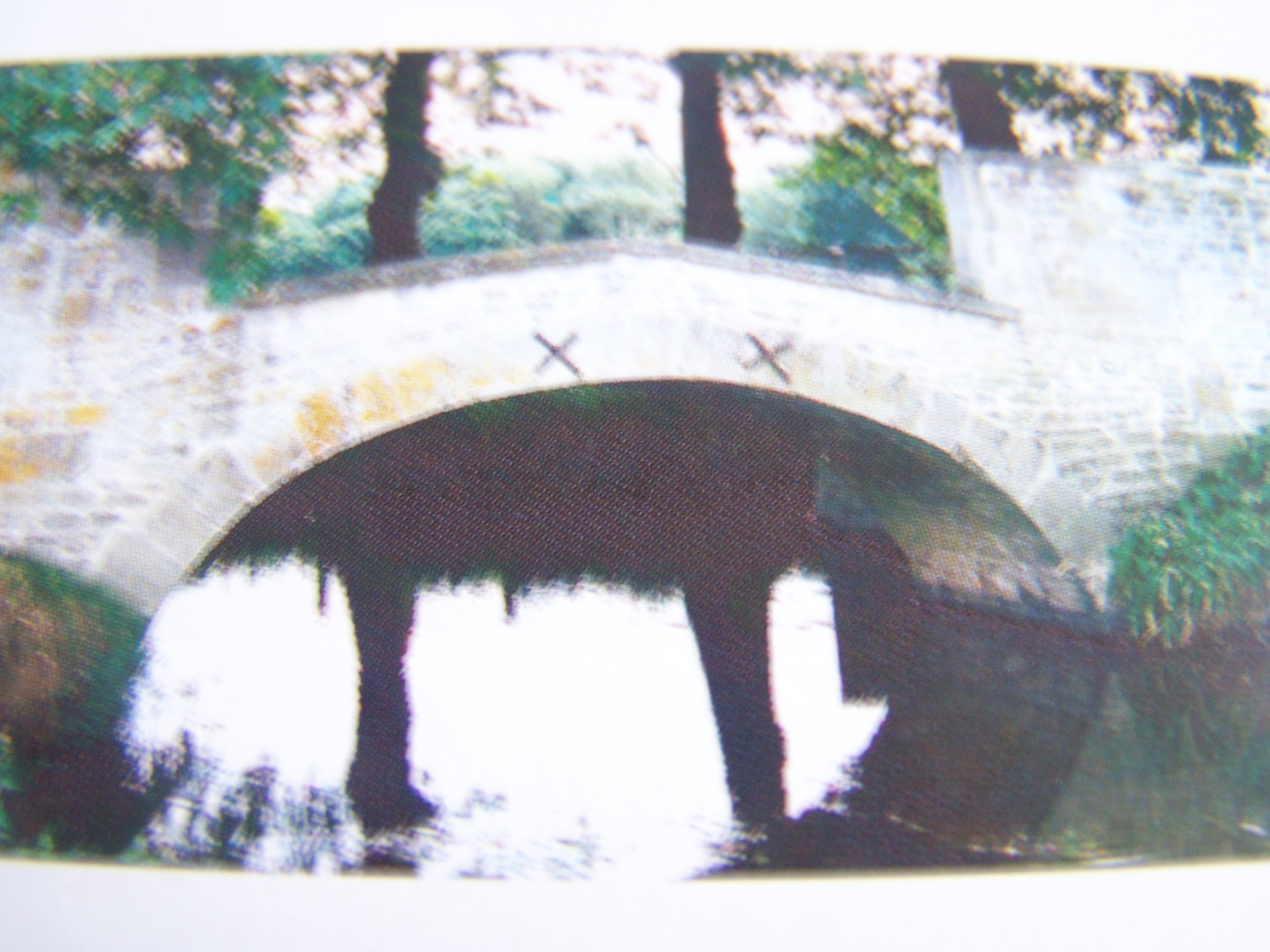
The old Creuilly limestone footbridge

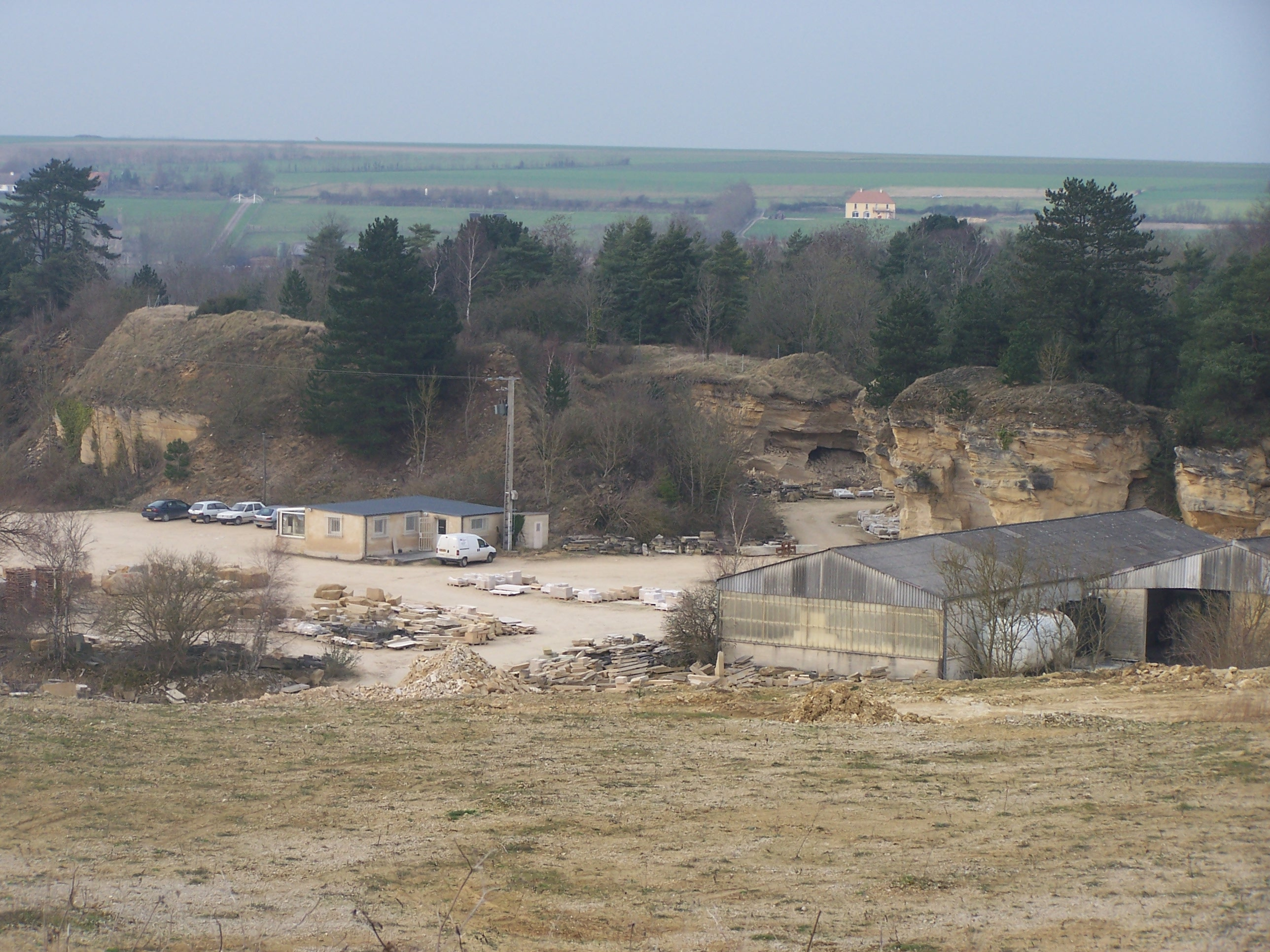
The Quarry

== Notable people linked to the commune ==
- Harry Crerar (1888-1965), Canadian General and "Commander of the land armies" of Canada during the Second World War. He made his headquarters in Amblie on 18 June 1944.

== See also ==
- Communes of the Calvados department

=== External links ===
- Amblie on the old National Geographic Institute website (in French)
- Amblie sur Seule on the 1750 Cassini Map
