= Arromanches-les-Bains =

- Commune
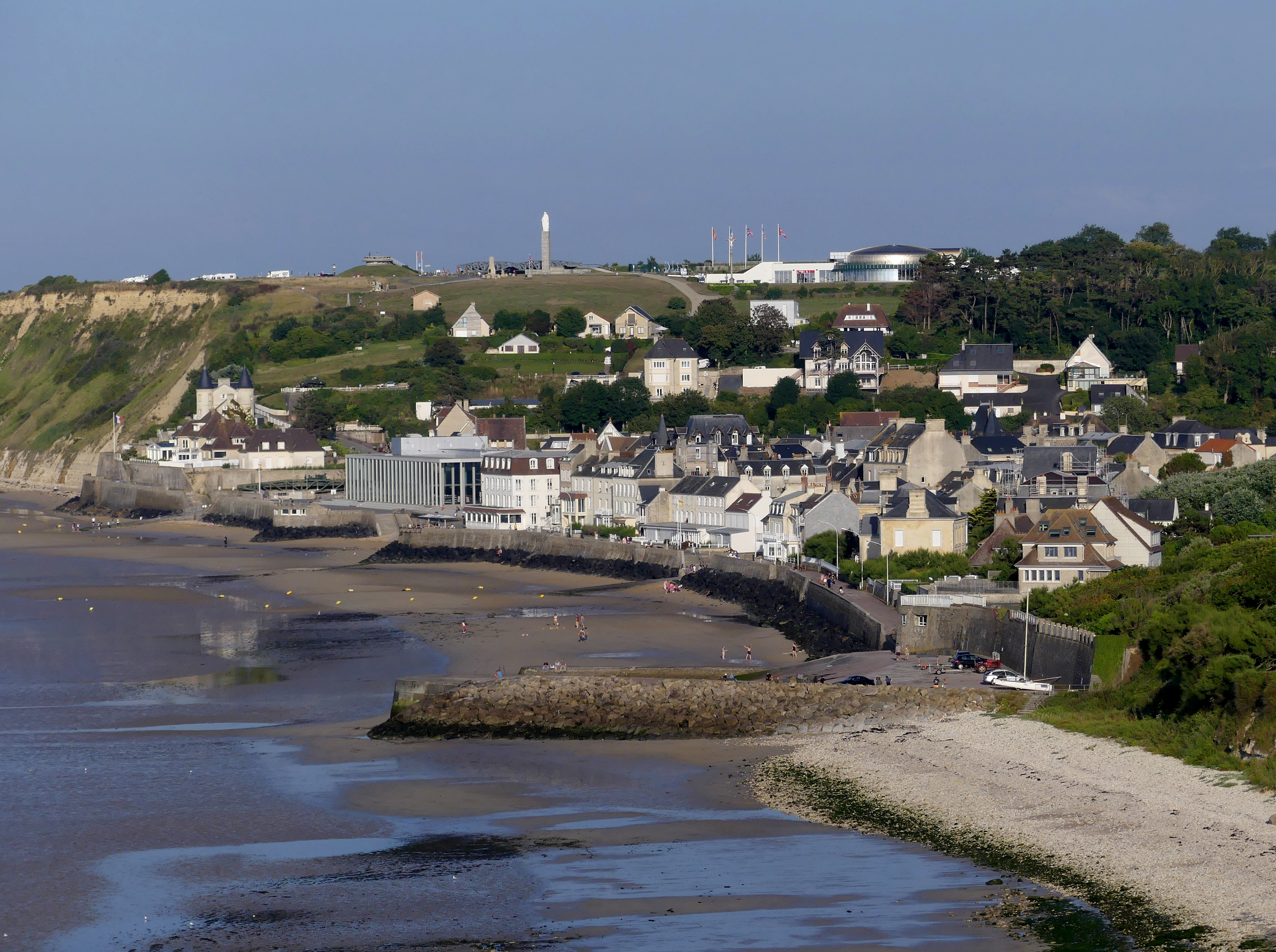
- Arromanches-les-Bains at low tide

- Coat of arms
- Location of Arromanches-les-Bains
- Location within France Location within Normandy
- Coordinates: 49°20′24″N 0°37′16″W
- Country: France
- Region: Normandy
- Department: Calvados
- Arrondissement: Bayeux
- Canton: Courseulles-sur-Mer
- Intercommunality: CC Bayeux Intercom

Government
  - Mayor (2020–2026): Marcel Bastide
- Area^{1}: 13.7 km^{2} (5.3 sq mi)
- Elevation: 15 m (49 ft)
- Highest elevation: 55 m (180 ft)
- Lowest elevation: 0 m (0 ft)
- Population (2023): 413
  - Density: 30.1/km^{2} (78.1/sq mi)
- Time zone: UTC+01:00 (CET)
  - Summer (DST): UTC+02:00 (CEST)
- INSEE/Postal code: 14021 /14117
- ^{1} French Land Register data, which excludes lakes, ponds, glaciers > 1 km^{2} (0.386 sq mi or 247 acres) and river estuaries.

Arromanches-les-Bains (French pronunciation: [aʁɔmɑ̃ʃ le bɛ̃]; or simply Arromanches) is a commune in the Calvados department in the Normandy region of north-western France.

== Geography ==
Arromanches-les-Bains is 12 km north-east of Bayeux and 10 km west of Courseulles-sur-Mer on the coast where the Normandy landings took place on D-Day, 6 June 1944. Access to the commune is by the D514 road from Tracy-sur-Mer in the west passing through the town and continuing to Saint-Côme-de-Fresné in the east. The D87 road also goes from the town south to Ryes. The D65 road goes east to Meuvaines. About a third of the commune is the urban area of the town with the rest farmland.

== History ==
Arromanches is remembered as a historic place of the Normandy landings and in particular as the place where a Mulberry harbour artificial port was installed. This artificial port allowed the disembarkation of 9,000 tons of materiel per day.

It was on the beach of Arromanches that, during the Invasion of Normandy immediately after D-Day, the Allies established an artificial temporary harbour to allow the unloading of heavy equipment without waiting for the conquest of deep water ports such as Le Havre or Cherbourg. Although at the centre of the Gold Beach landing zone, Arromanches was spared the brunt of the fighting on D-Day so the installation and operation of the port could proceed as quickly as possible without damaging the beach and destroying surrounding lines of communication. The port was commissioned on 14 June 1944.

This location was one of two sites chosen to establish the necessary port facilities to unload quantities of supplies and troops needed for the invasion during June 1944, the other being built further west at Omaha Beach. The British built huge floating concrete caissons which, after being towed from England, then had to be assembled to form walls and piers forming and defining the artificial port called the Mulberry harbour. These comprised pontoons linked to the land by floating roadways. One of these ports was assembled at Arromanches and even today sections of the Mulberry harbour still remain with huge concrete blocks sitting on the sand and more can be seen further out at sea.

Some key figures: by 12 June 1944 more than 300,000 men, 54,000 vehicles, 104,000 tons of supplies had been landed. During 100 days of operation of the port 2.5 million men, 500,000 vehicles, and 4 million tons of materiel were landed. The best performance of the port was in the last week of July 1944: during those seven days the traffic through Arromanches exceeded 136,000 tons or 20,000 tons per day.

Today, Arromanches is mainly a tourist town. Situated in a good location for visiting all of the battle sites and war cemeteries, there is also a museum at Arromanches with information about Operation Overlord and in particular, the Mulberry harbours.

On 21 September 2013 Bradford-based sand sculpting company Sand in Your Eye created a tribute called "The Fallen 9,000". It was a temporary sculpture project—a visual representation of 9,000 people drawn in the sand which equates the number of civilians, German forces and Allies that died during the D-day landings. It coincided with Peace Day, and was washed away with the tide at the end of the day.

In June 2026 a commemorative plaque to honour the contribution of the Dutch merchant navy and Royal Netherlands Navy personnel to the Allied landings of 6 June 1944 was unveiled in Arromanches-les-Bains.

=== Heraldry ===
Arms of Arromanches-les-Bains	Blazon: Azure, an anchor of Or debruised by a mullet of Argent between two chains of Sable posed in chevron inverted broken, in chief Gules debruised by a leopard of Or armed and tongued Azure.

== Administration ==
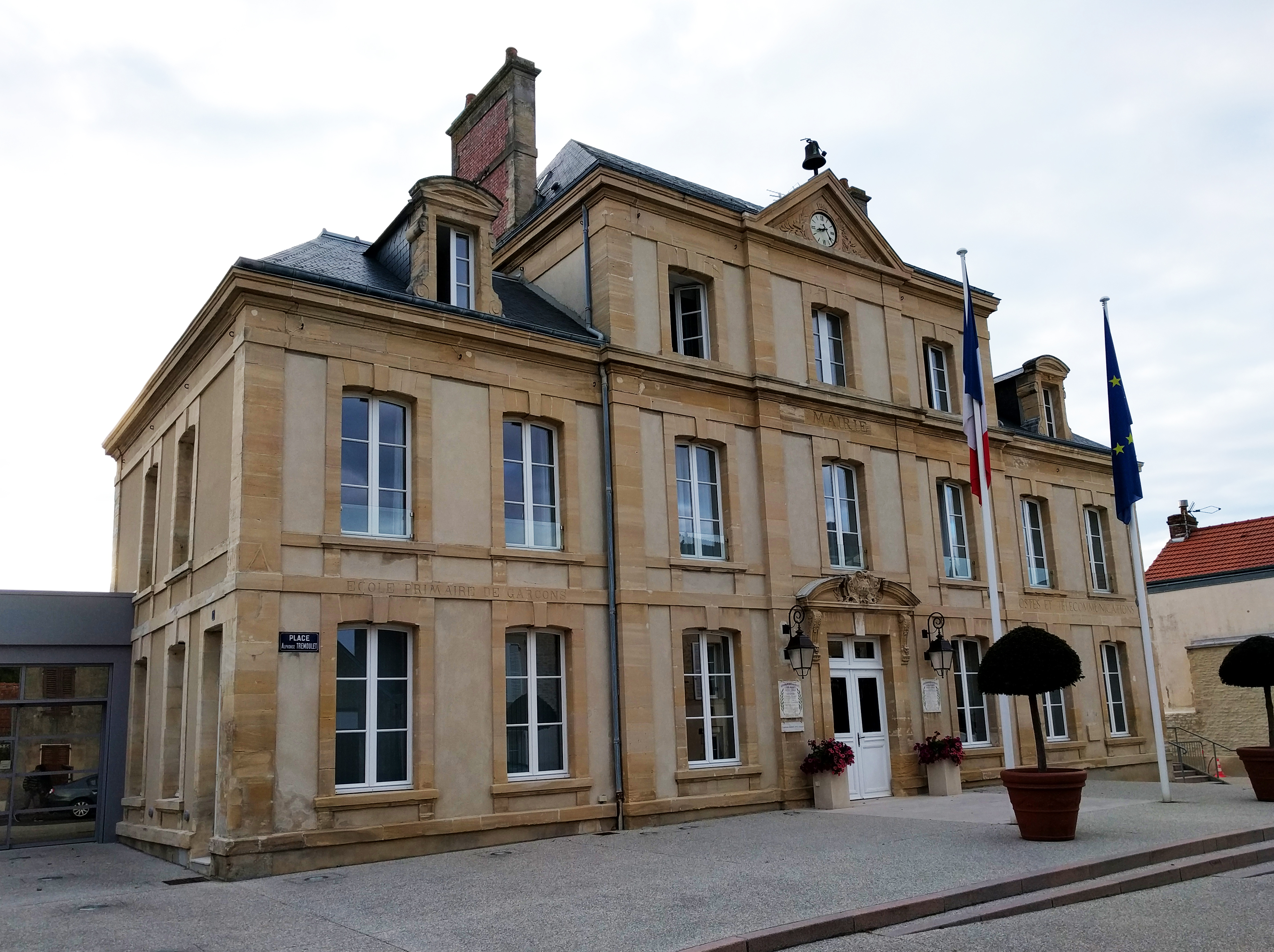
Town hall.

List of Successive Mayors

From	To	Name	Party	Position
1995	2020	Patrick Jardin		Optician
2020	2026	Marcel Bastide		

== Demography ==
The inhabitants of the commune are known as Arromanchais or Arromanchaises in French.

Historical population

Year	Pop.	±% p.a.
1793	430	—
1821	493	+0.49%
1846	500	+0.06%
1872	532	+0.24%
1901	444	−0.62%
1926	282	−1.80%
1946	282	+0.00%
1962	298	+0.35%
1968	339	+2.17%

Year	Pop.	±% p.a.
1975	355	+0.66%
1982	395	+1.54%
1990	409	+0.44%
1999	552	+3.39%
2007	609	+1.24%
2012	546	−2.16%
2017	489	−2.18%
2023	413	−2.78%

Source: EHESS and INSEE

== Culture and heritage ==
=== Civil heritage ===
The commune has many buildings and sites that are registered as historical monuments:

- Houses (19th century)
- The Notre-Dame-des-Flots Monument at Rue du Calvaire (1911)
- The Grand Hotel at 22 Rue du Maréchal Joffre (20th century)
- The old Radar Station at Le Callouet (20th century)
- The Château du Petit Fontaine (1764)
- An Orientation table (20th century)
- The Artificial Harbour and Winston Churchill Harbour (20th century)
- The 6 June 1944 Museum (1954)
- A Lavoir (Public laundry) (1896)
- The Town Hall and Boys' Primary School (1884)
- The Village (Antiquity)
- Houses and Hotels (18th-20th century)

Other sites of interest

- The Museum of the Landings
- Arromanches 360 degrees

=== Religious heritage ===
The commune has several religious buildings and sites that are registered as historical monuments:

A Presbytery at 4 avenue de l'Amiral Mountbatten (1836)

A Monumental Cross at Rue du Calvaire (1901)

A Cemetery (1857)

The Parish Church of Saint Peter (19th century) The Church contains many items that are registered as historical objects:

- Stained glass windows (19th-20th century)
- Ciboria (19th century)
- A Paten (19th century)
- A Monstrance (19th century)
- A Chalice (19th century)
- A Box for Oil for the sick (20th century)
- An Ex-voto Painting: Fishermen in danger (19th century)
- A Painting: Saint Peter (19th century)
- A Painting: Saint Paul (19th century)
- A Cross: Christ on the Cross (19th century)
- A Table (17th century)
- 34 Pews (19th century)
- The Choir bench and wood panelling (19th century)
- A Pulpit (19th century)
- A Baptismal font (19th century)
- An Altar, Tabernacle, and Retable (19th century)
- An Altar (1976)
- An Altar (1) (18th century)
- The Furniture in the Church

== Picture gallery ==
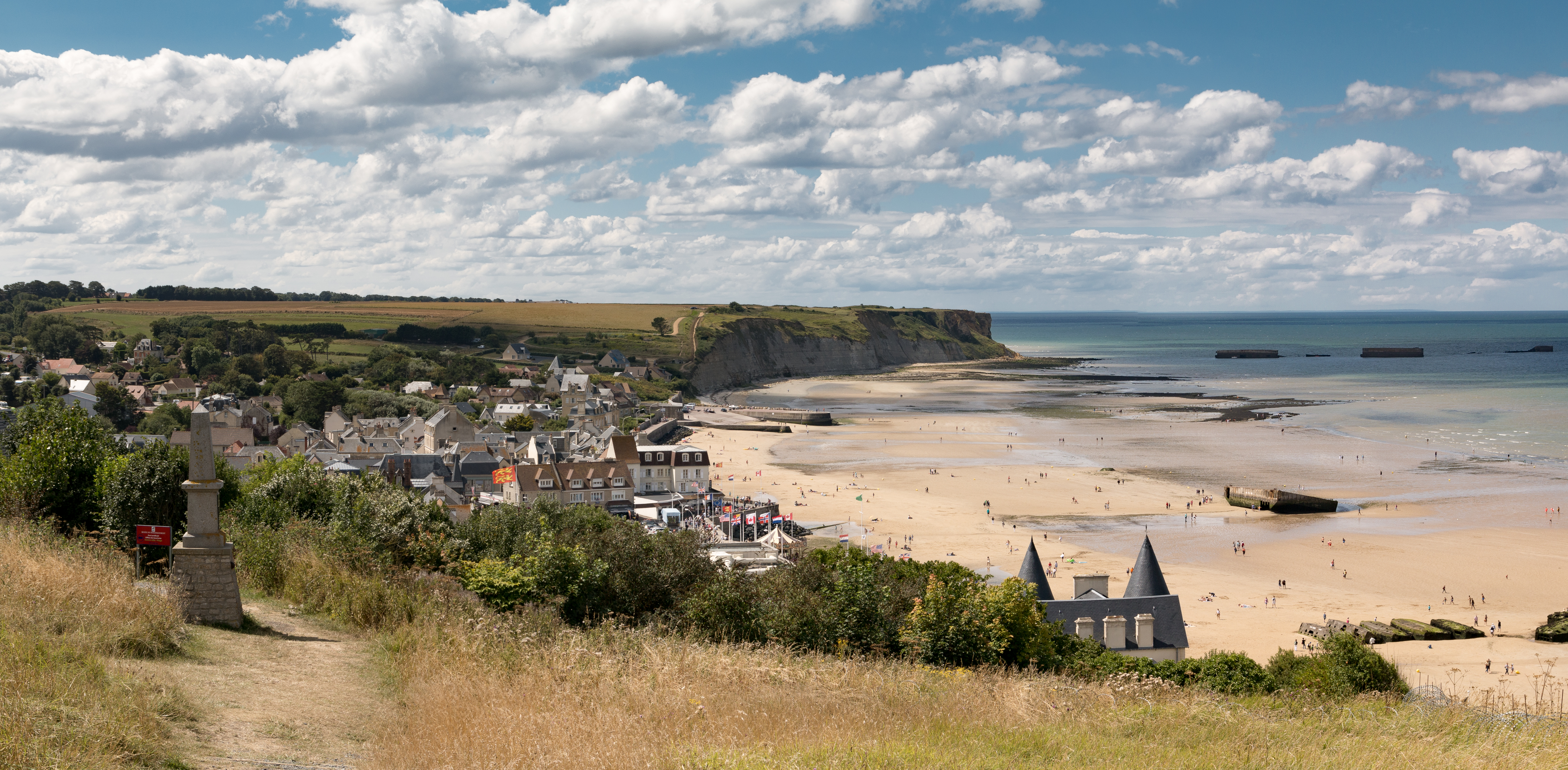
Arromanches-les-Bains Panorama

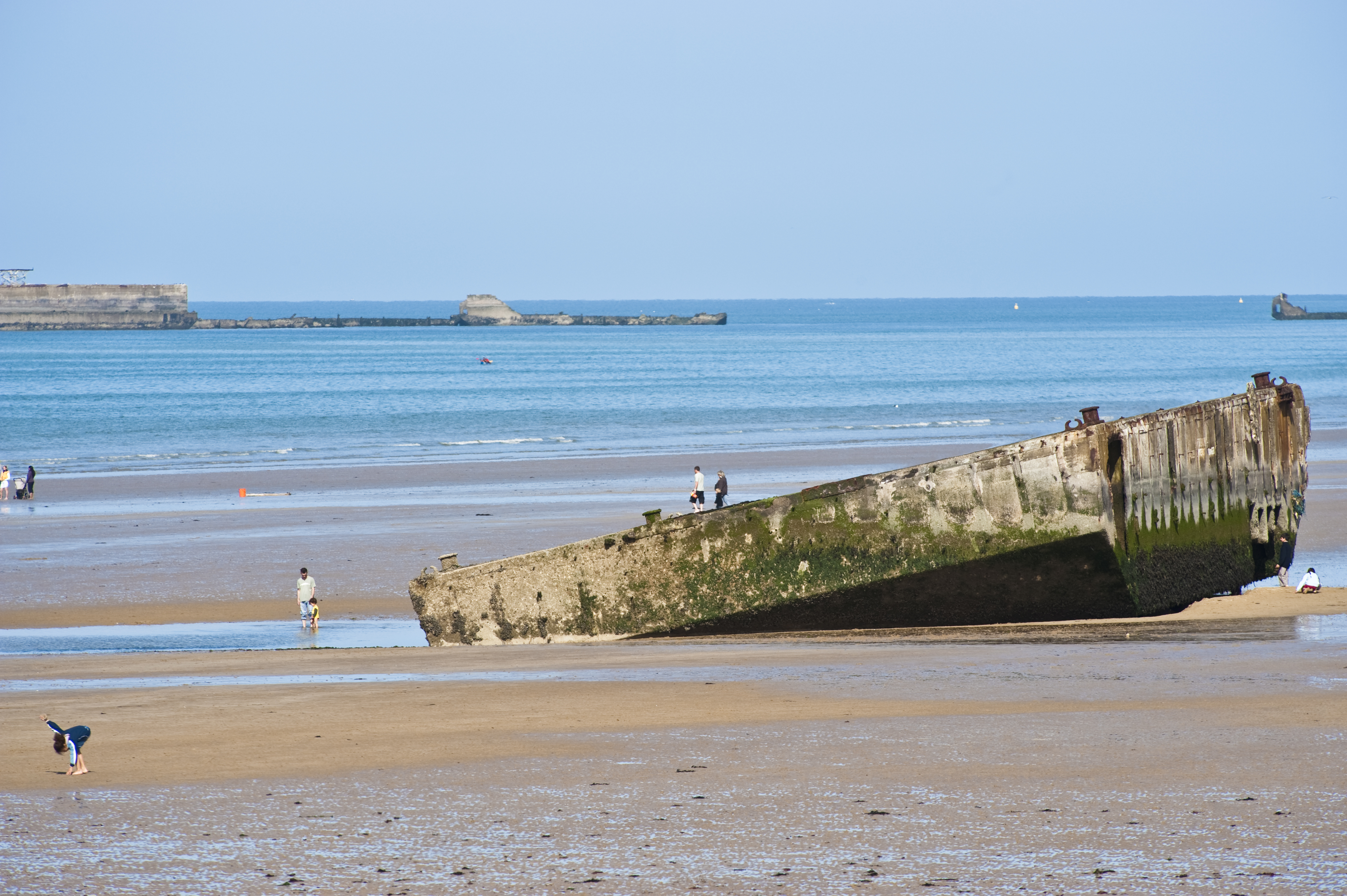
Remains of the Mulberry harbour on the beach

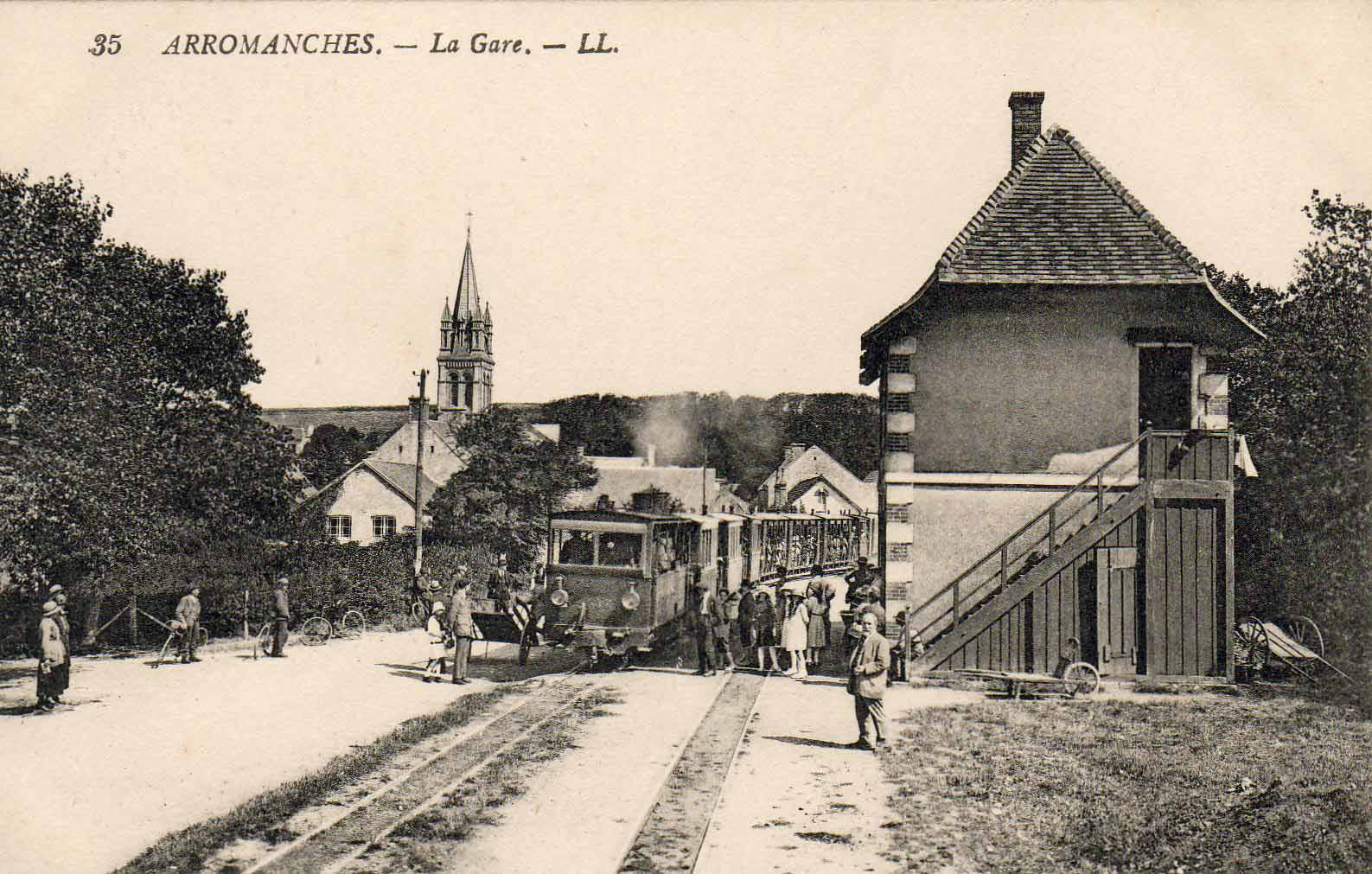
Arromanches railway station around 1901

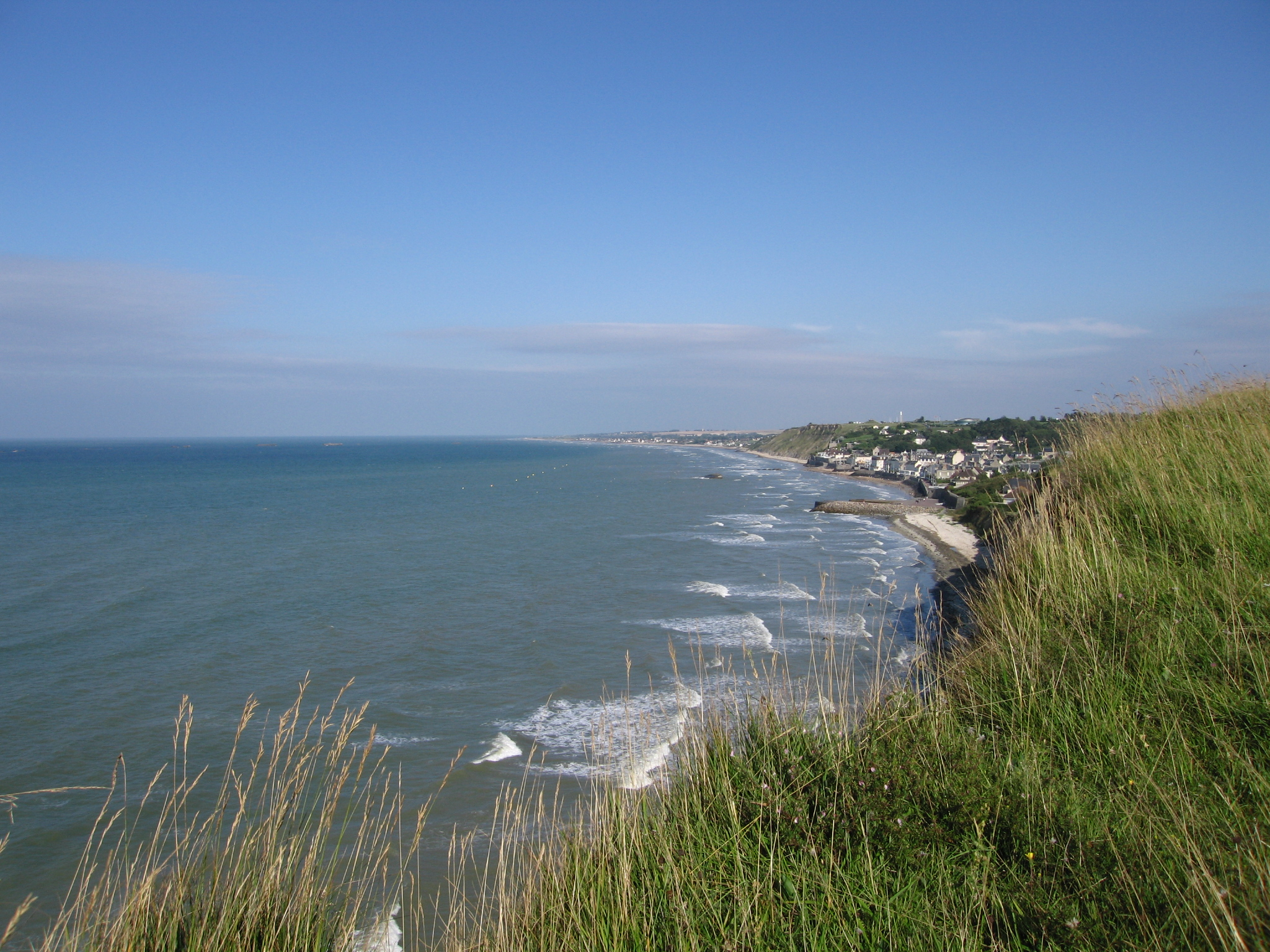
View of the beach

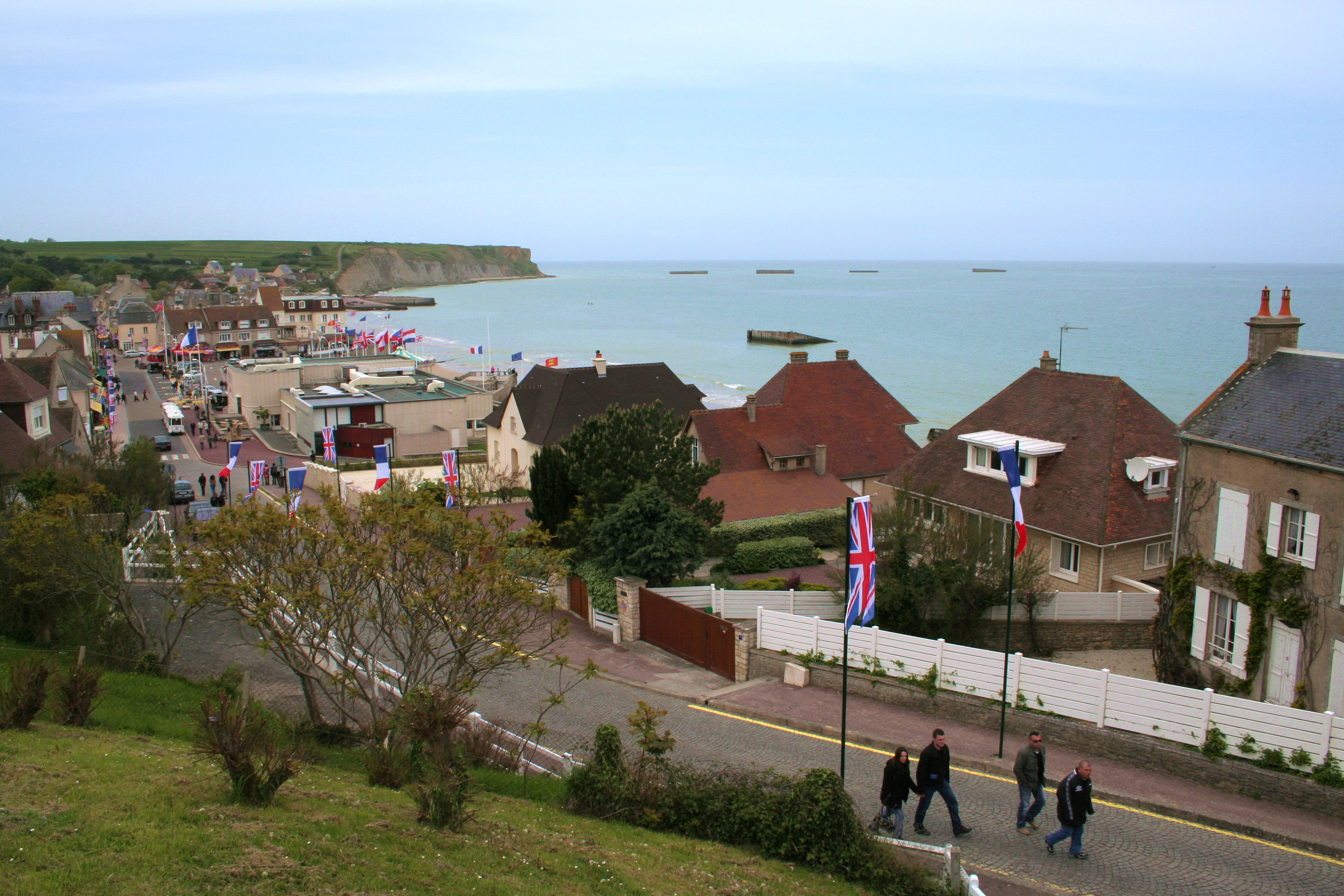
Arromanches town

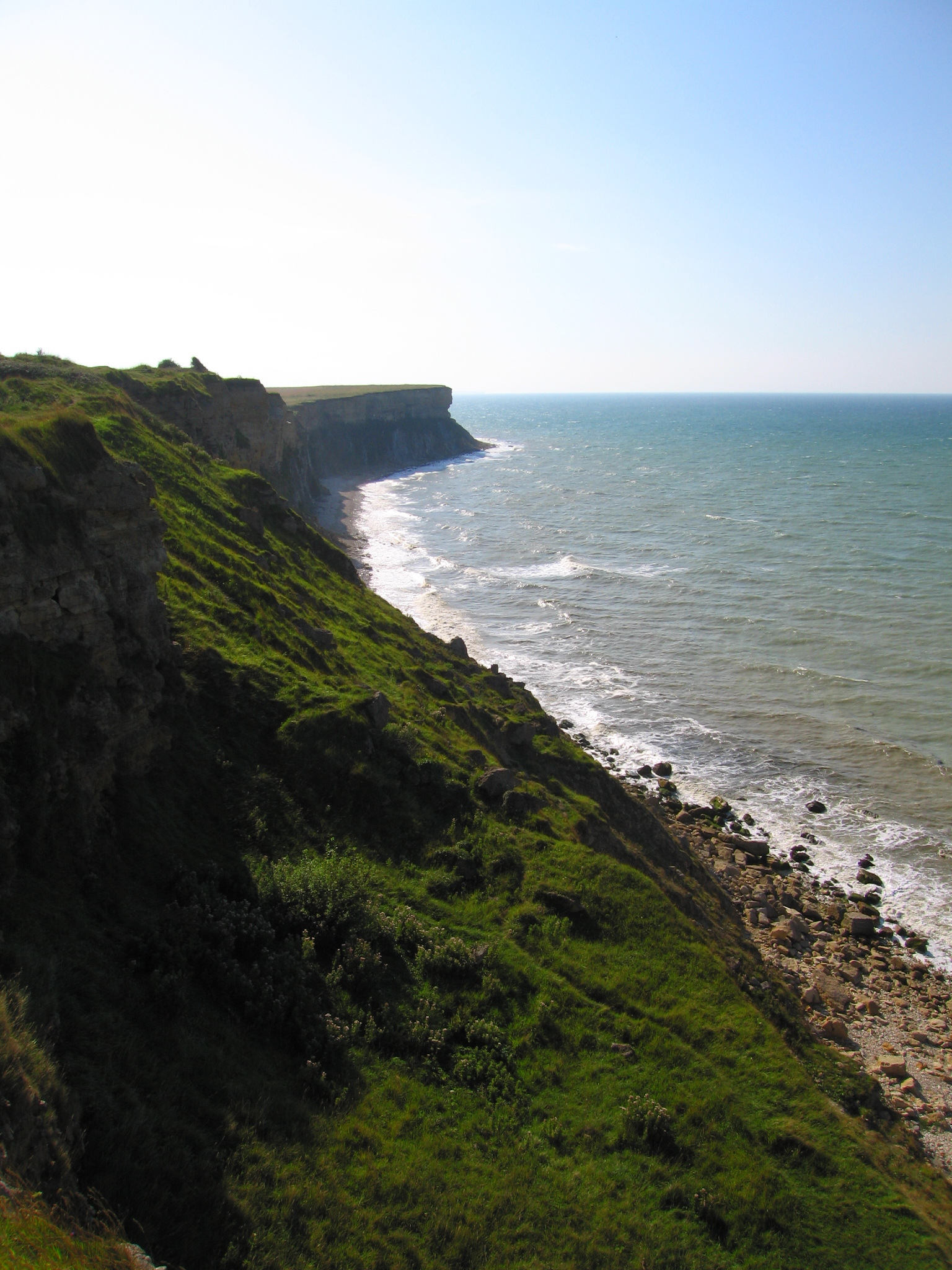
The cliffs along the coast

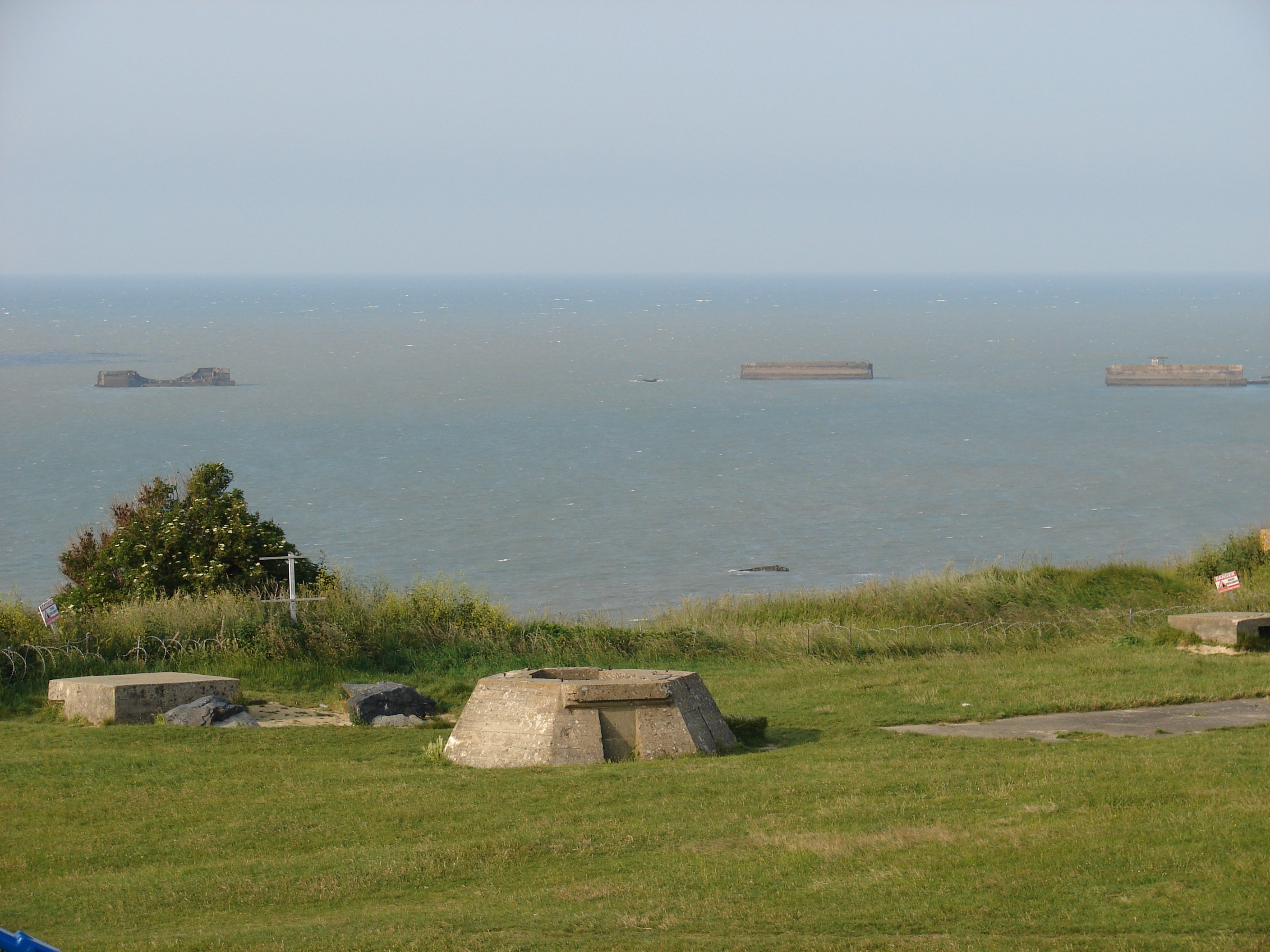
Remains of German defences and the Mulberries in the background

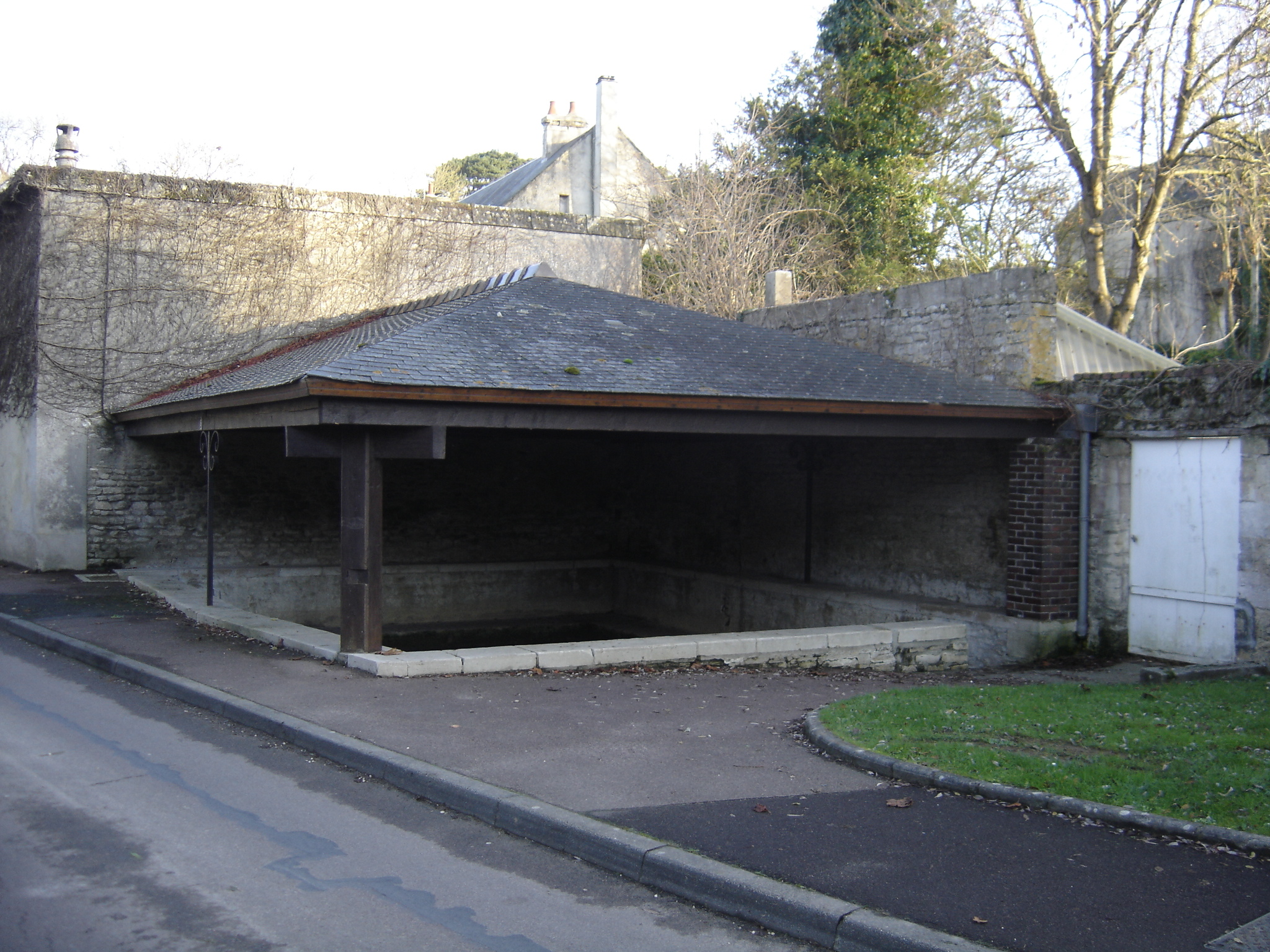
The Lavoir (public laundry)

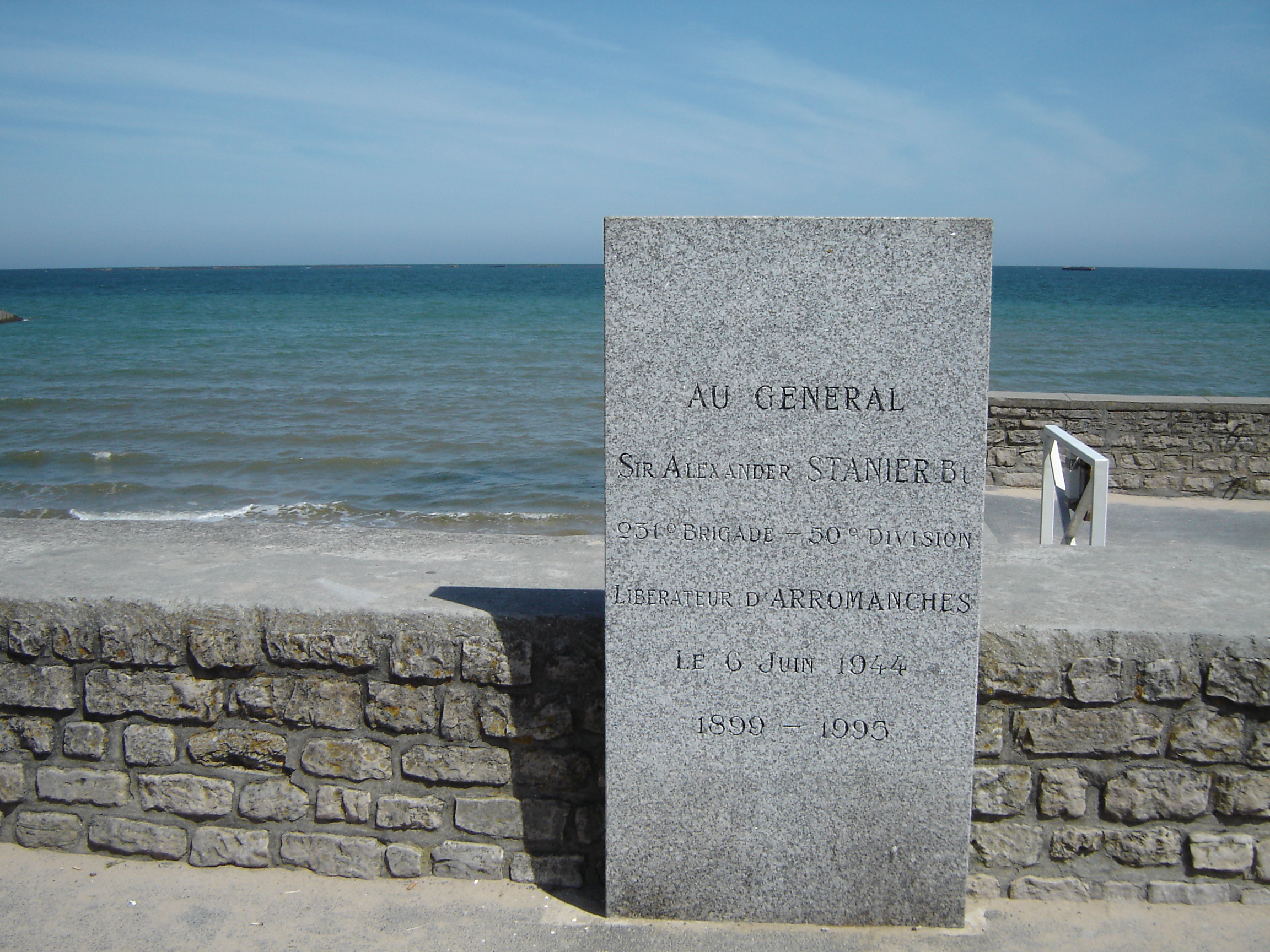
Arromanches memorial

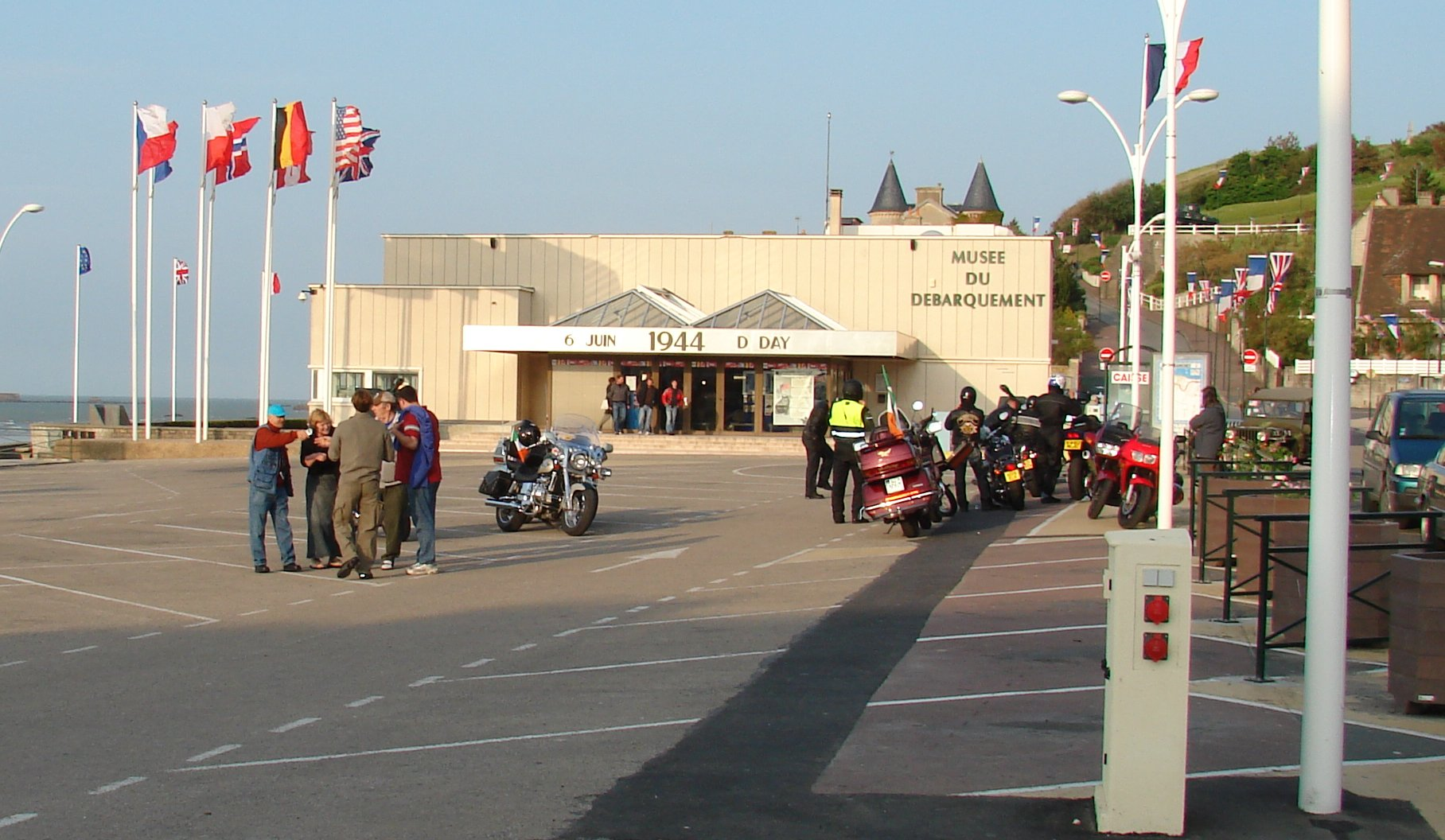
The Museum of the Landings

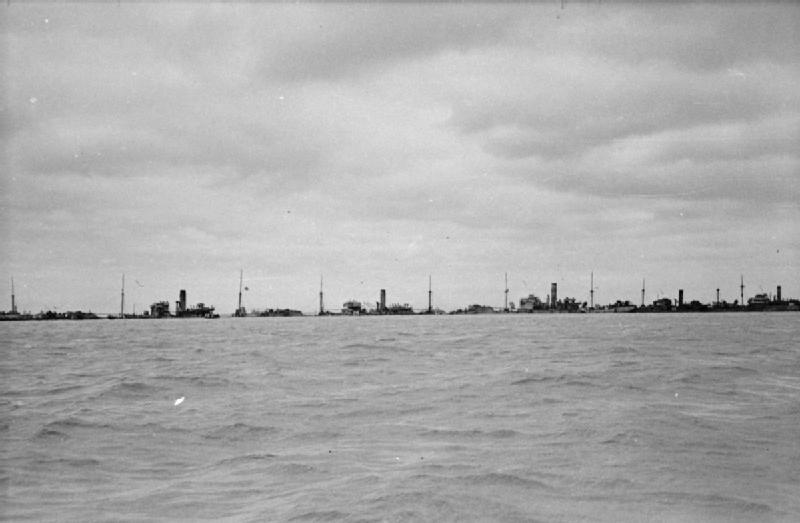
Mulberry harbour in operation (1944)

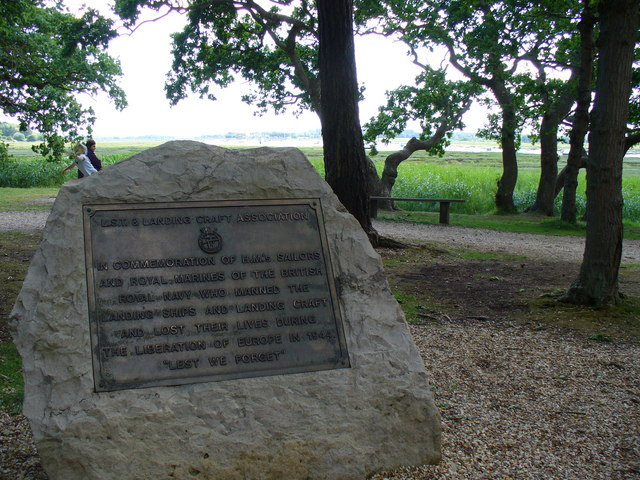
Commemorative plaque

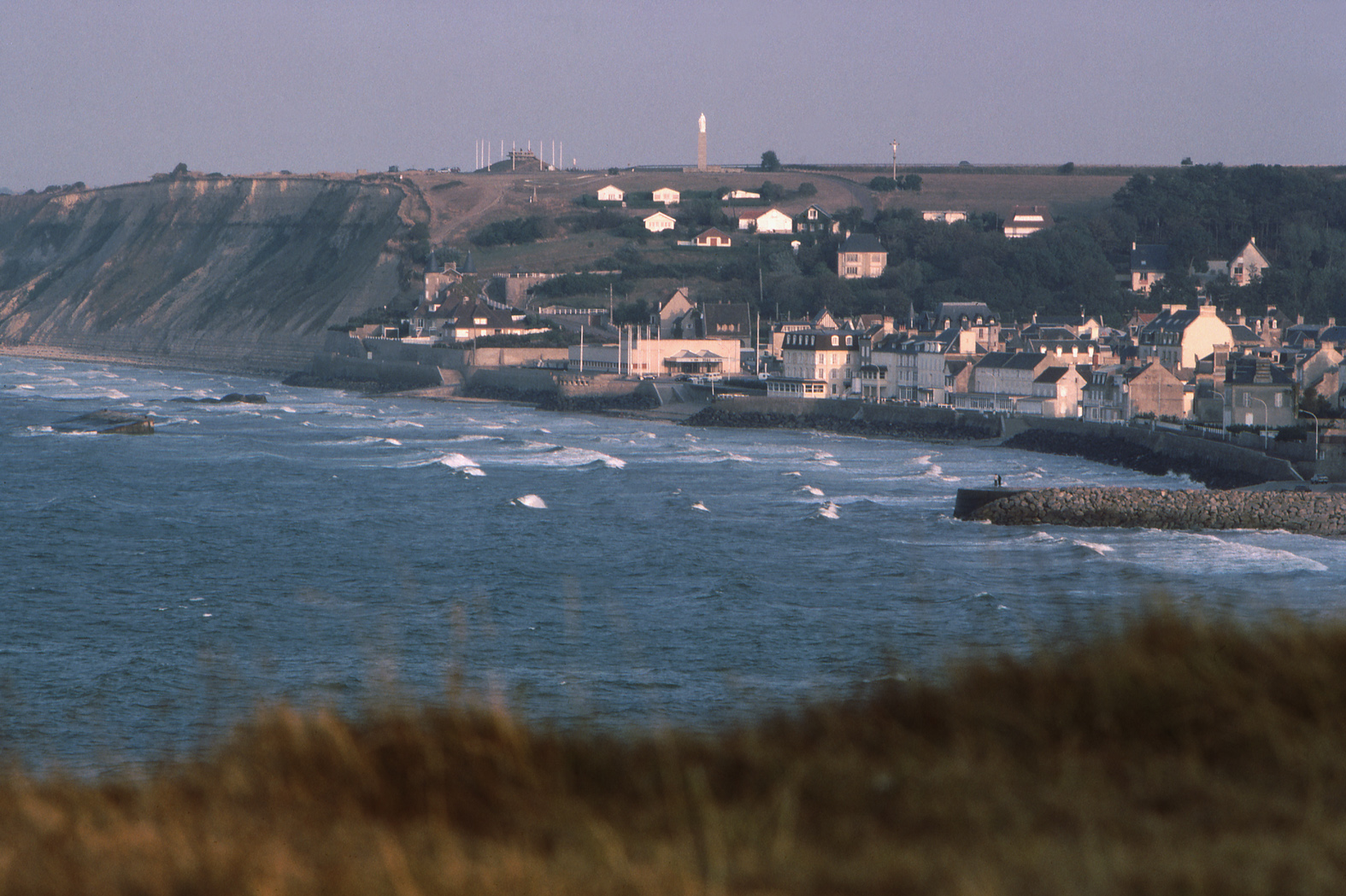
Arromanches from Cape Manvieux

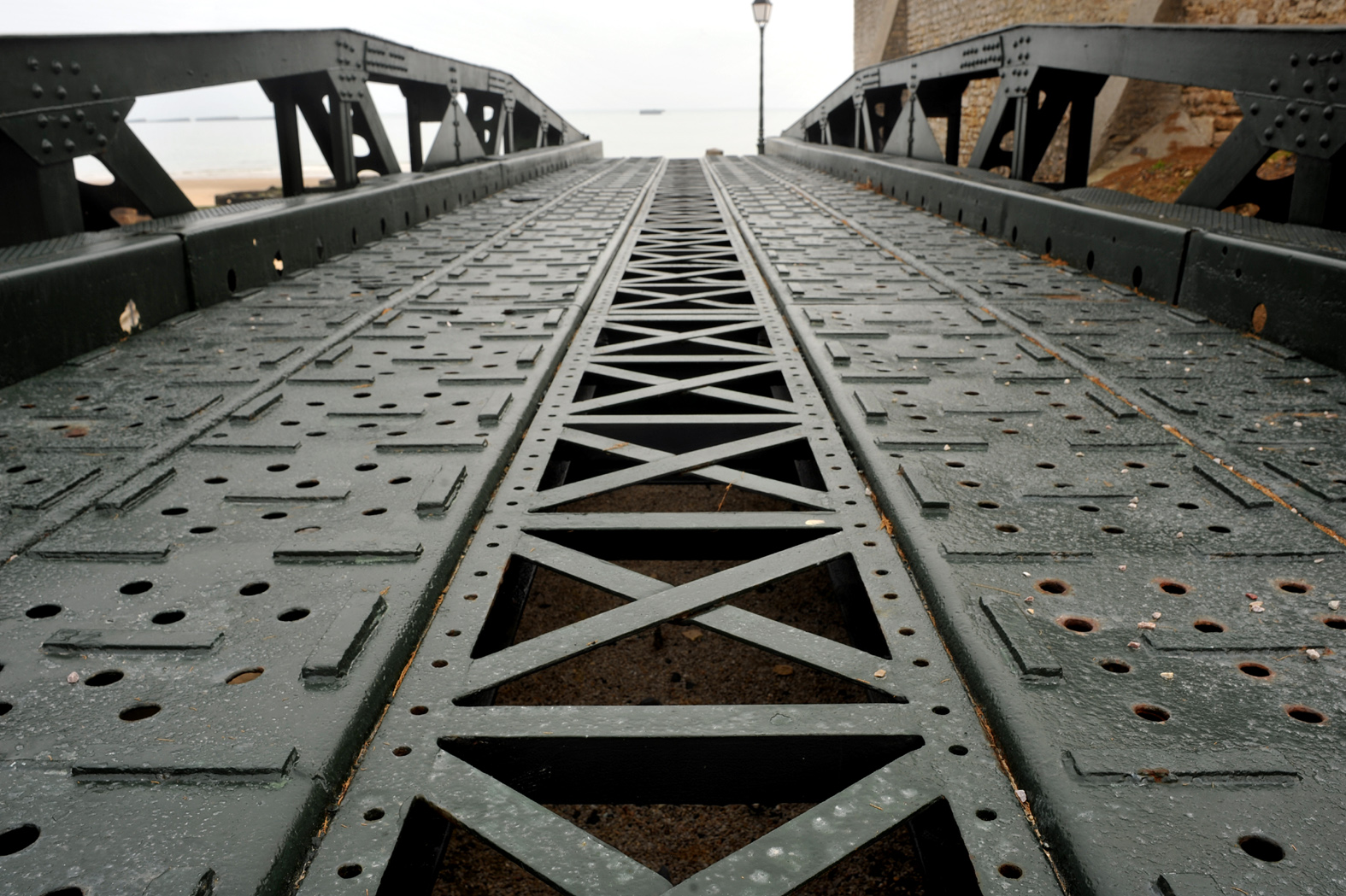
A "whale pier" bridge element from the Mulberry harbour on display since 2004

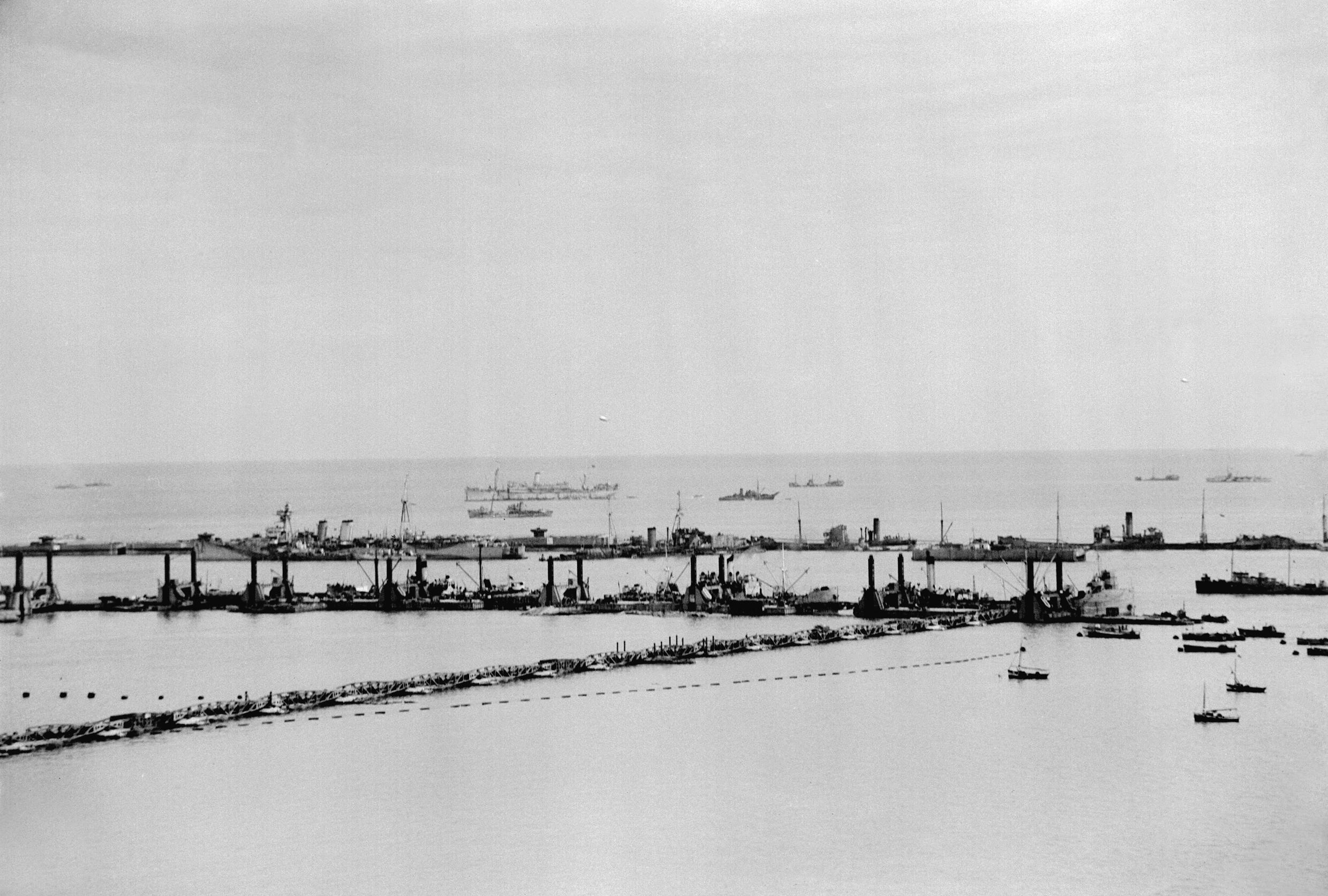
The Mulberry harbour in June 1944

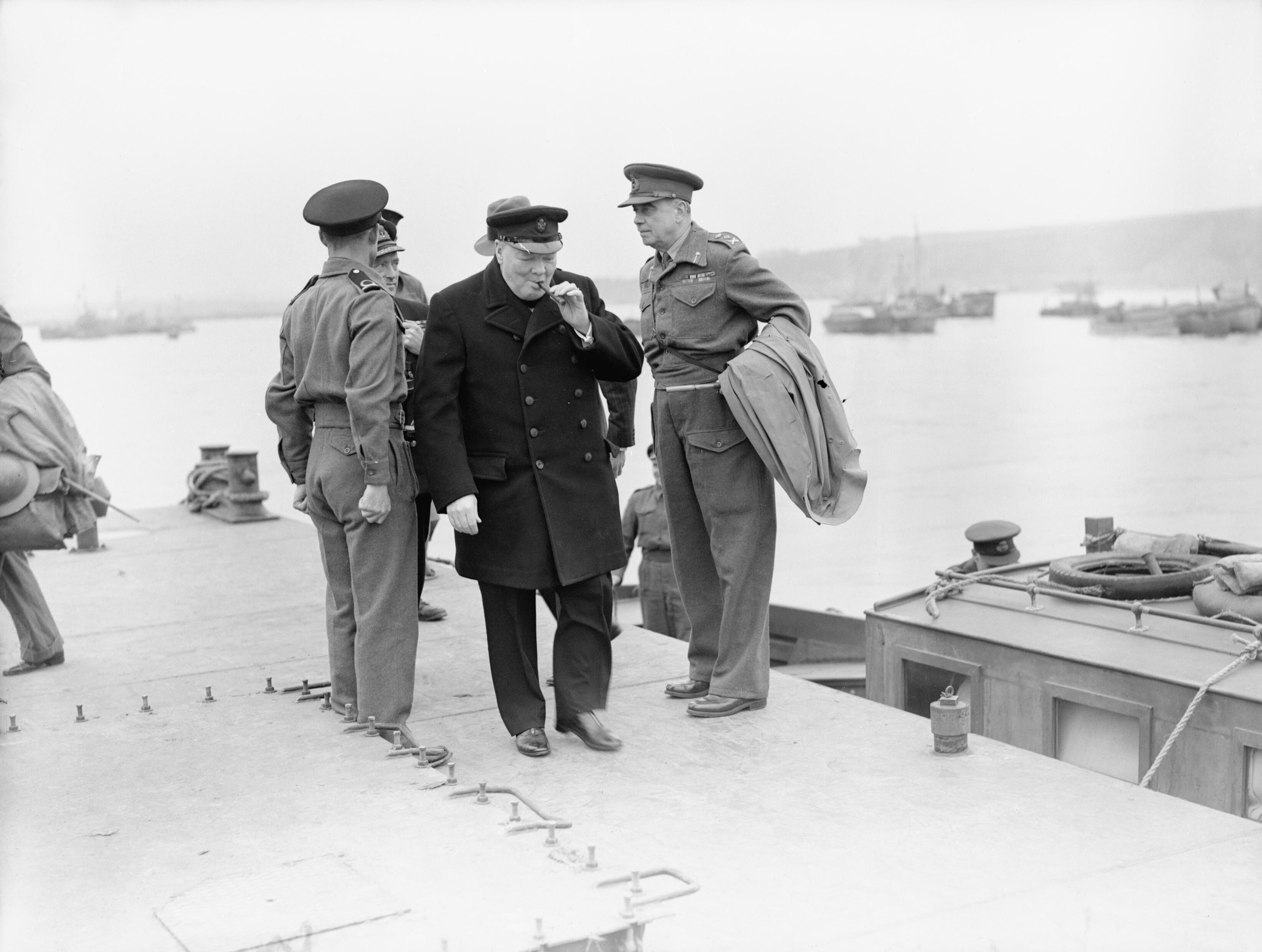
Winston Churchill at Arromanches 21–23 July 1944

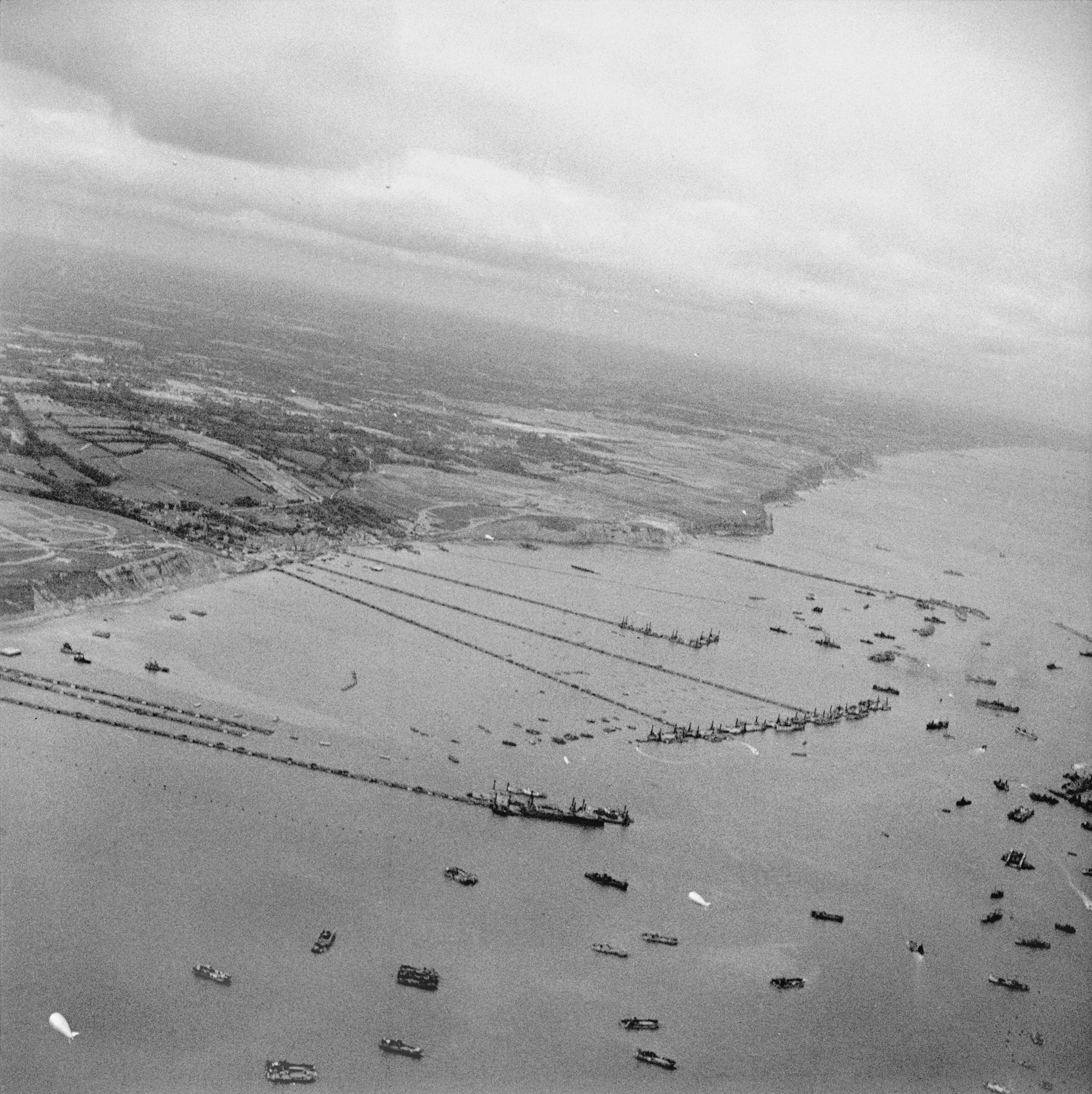
Aerial view of the Mulberry harbour in September 1944

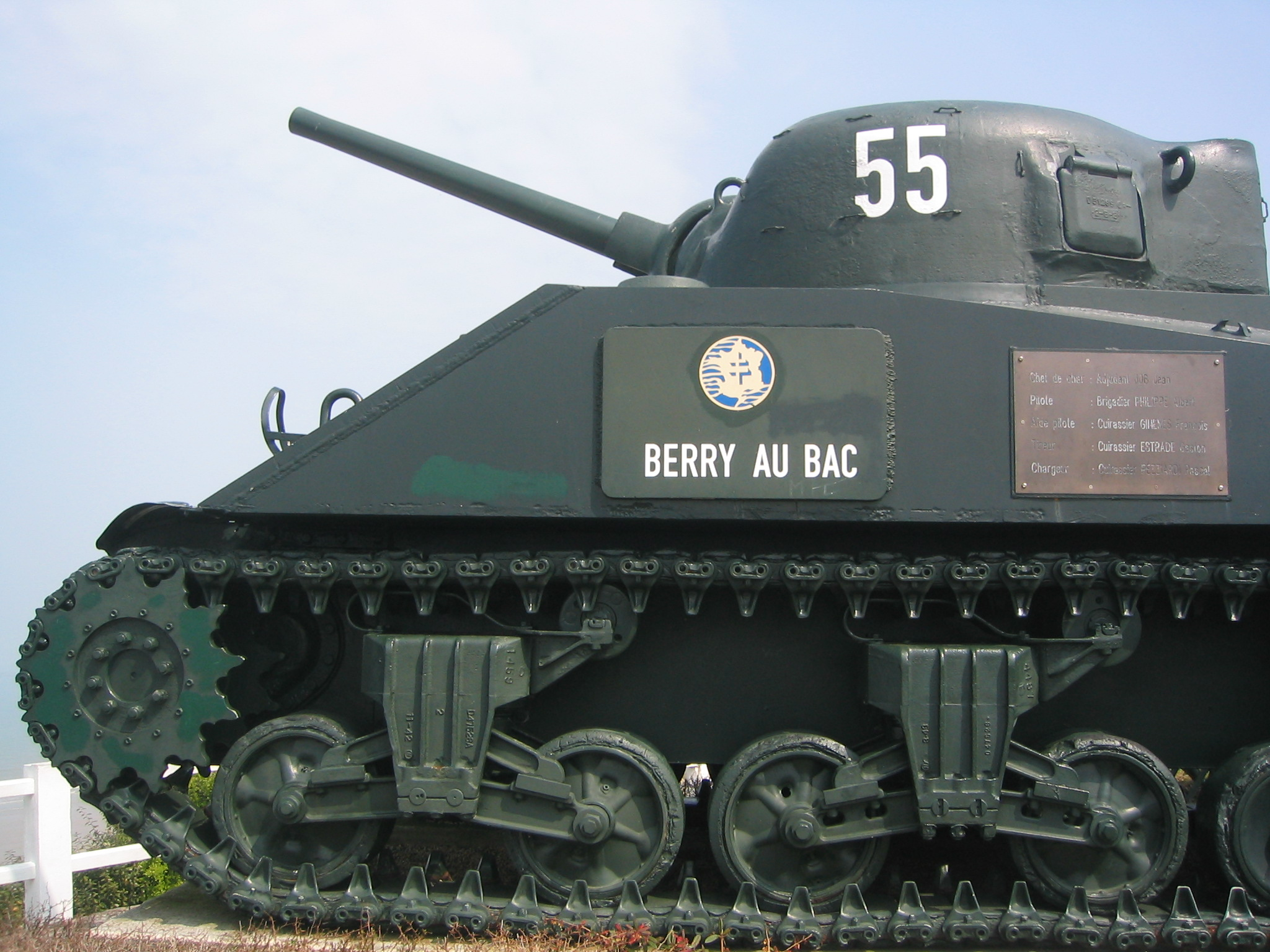
Sherman tank displayed at Arromanches

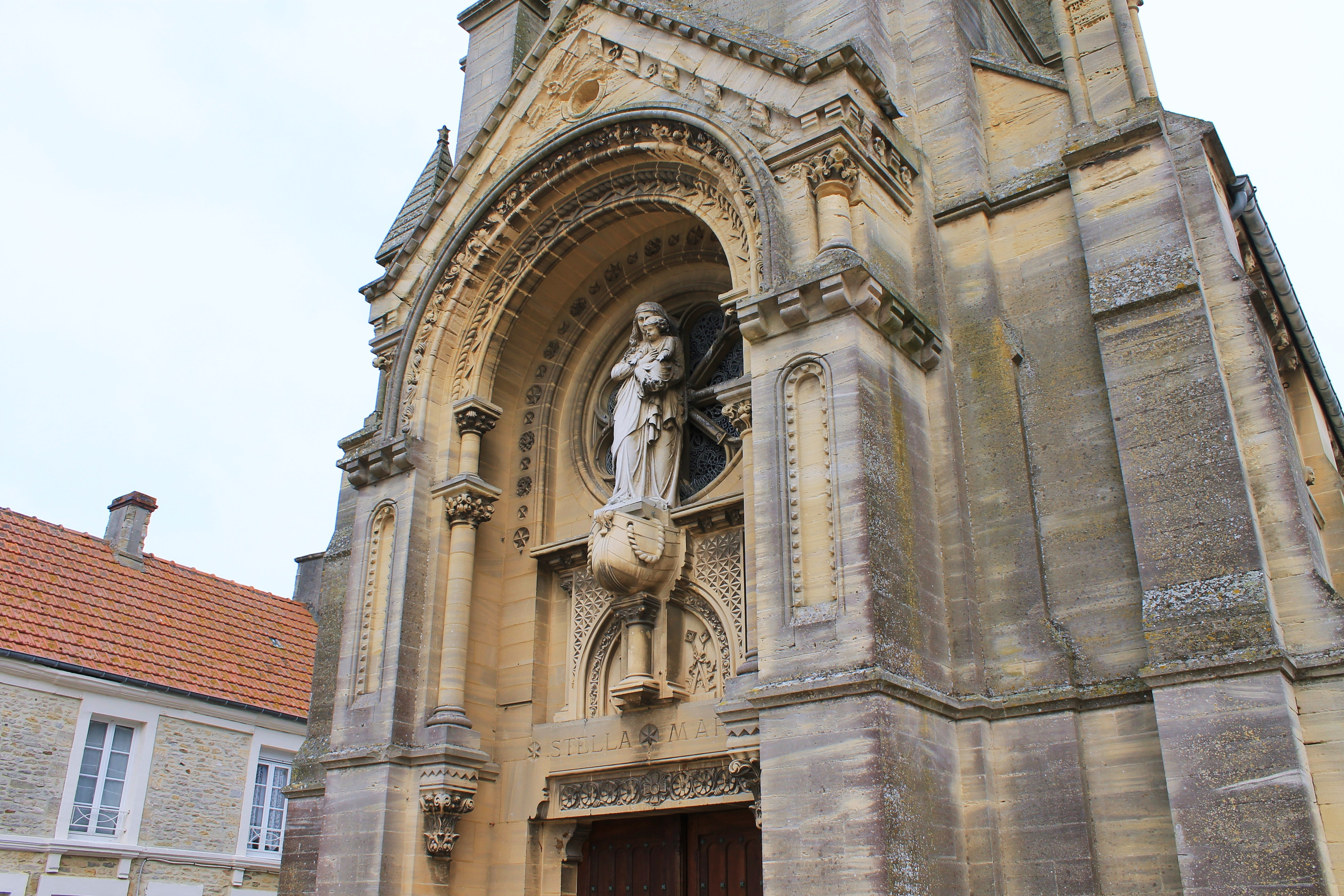
Arromanches Church

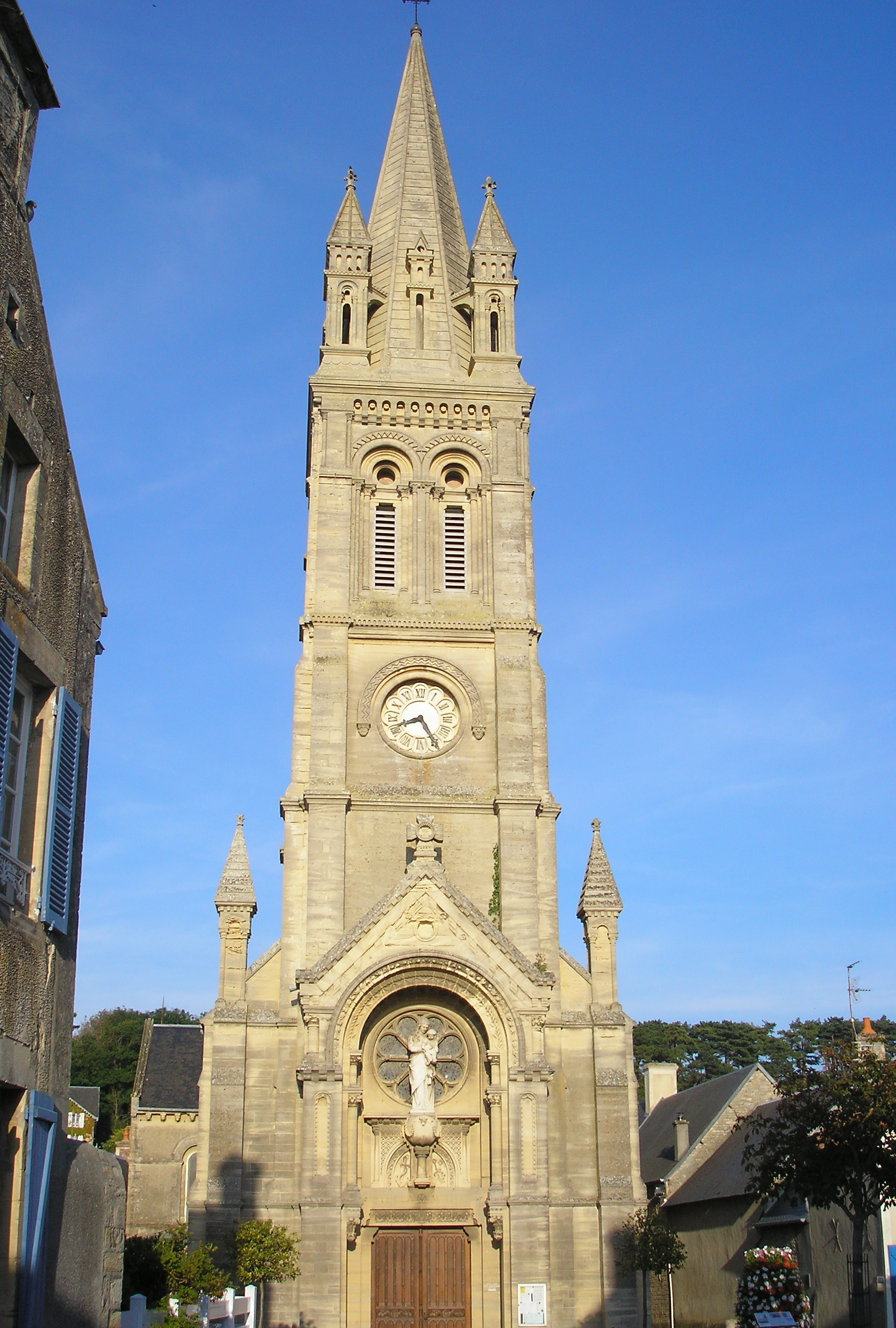
Church of Saint Peter

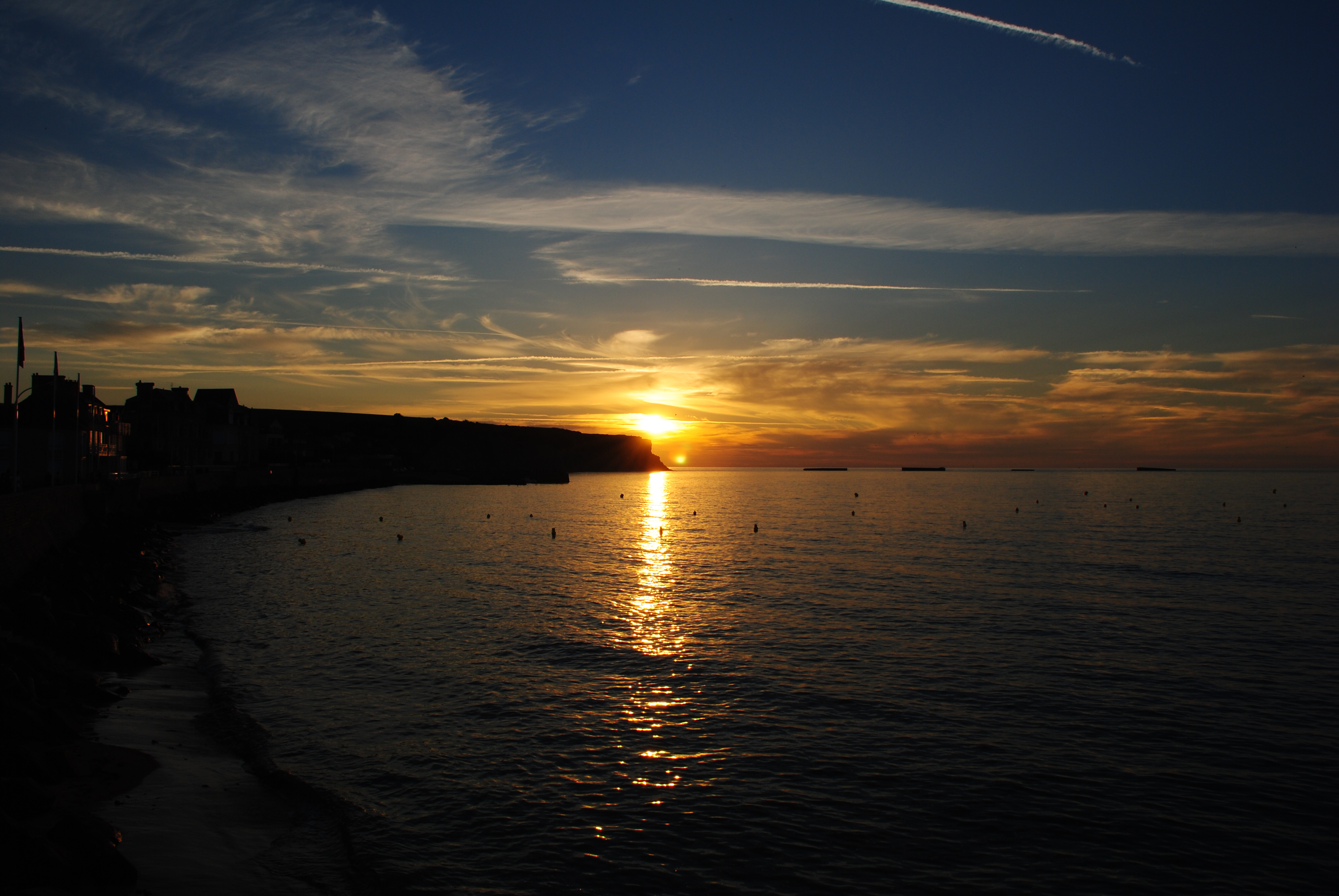
Sunset at Arromanches

== Notable people linked to the commune ==
- Jules Carpentier, French inventor. A main street is named in his honour.
- François Carpentier, son of Jules Carpentier, French architect and mayor of the commune. He created the Museum of the Landings in Arromanches.
- Sylvie Joly owned a villa in the commune. Her father was mayor of the commune from 1947 to 1963.
- The Boisgelin family owned a large part of the commune and still have a large house.

== See also ==
- Communes of the Calvados department
- Mulberry harbour
- French aircraft carrier Arromanches (R95)

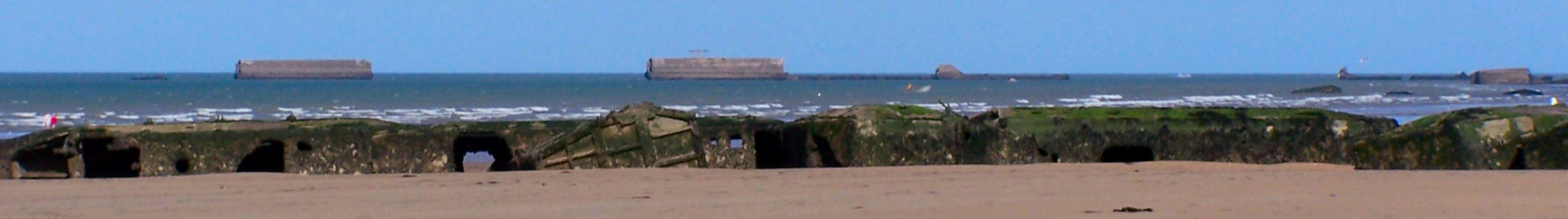
Panorama
