= Ryes =

- Commune
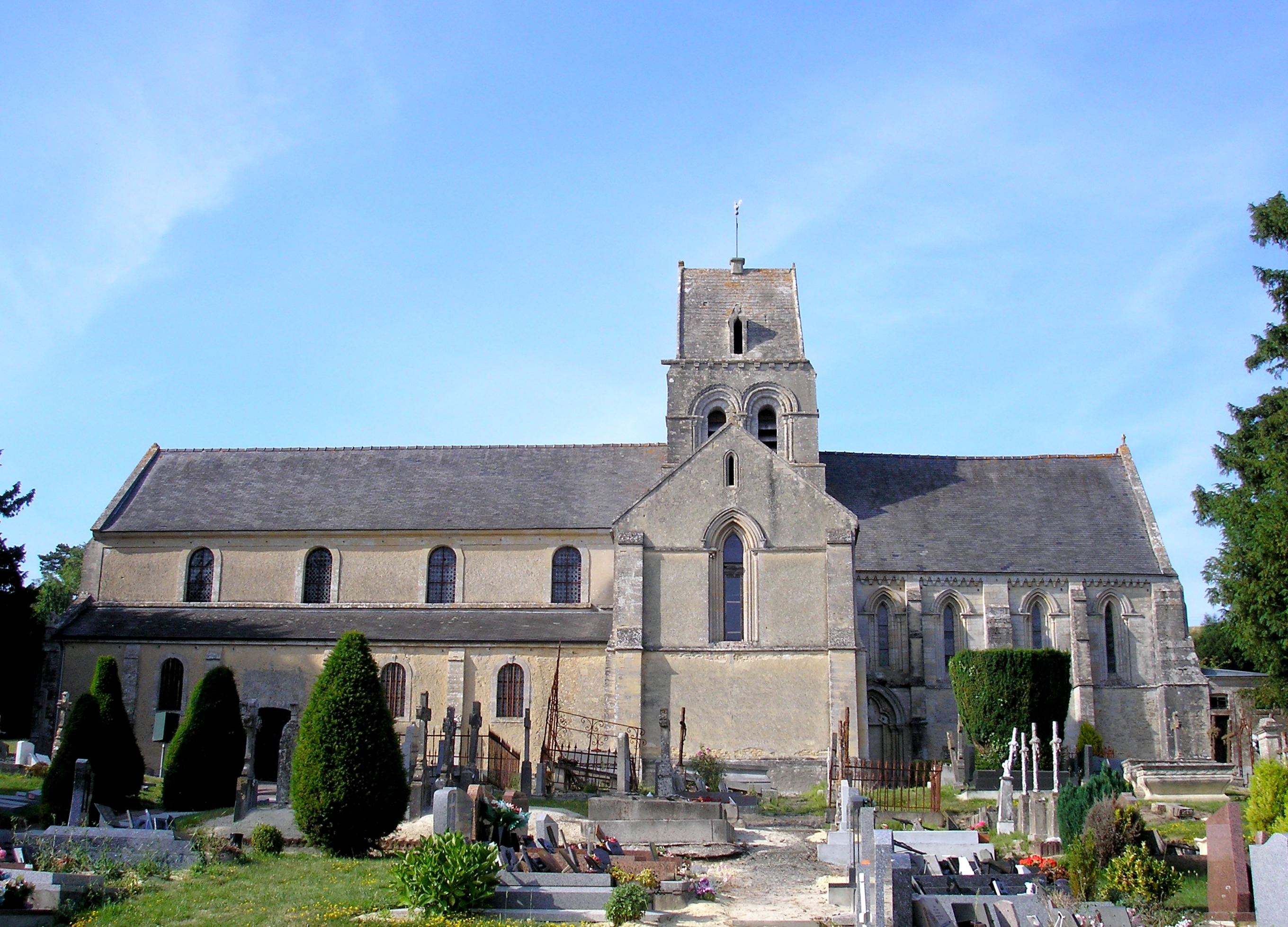
- Saint Martin

- Coat of arms
- Location of Ryes
- Location within France Location within Normandy
- Coordinates: 49°18′45″N 0°37′21″W
- Country: France
- Region: Normandy
- Department: Calvados
- Arrondissement: Bayeux
- Canton: Bayeux
- Intercommunality: CC Bayeux Intercom

Government
  - Mayor (2020–2026): Roger Gucciardi
- Area^{1}: 9.59 km^{2} (3.70 sq mi)
- Elevation: 20 m (66 ft)
- Highest elevation: 59 m (194 ft)
- Lowest elevation: 15 m (49 ft)
- Population (2023): 482
  - Density: 50.3/km^{2} (130/sq mi)
- Time zone: UTC+01:00 (CET)
  - Summer (DST): UTC+02:00 (CEST)
- INSEE/Postal code: 14552 /14400
- ^{1} French Land Register data, which excludes lakes, ponds, glaciers > 1 km^{2} (0.386 sq mi or 247 acres) and river estuaries.

Ryes (French pronunciation: [ʁi]) is a commune in the Calvados department in the Normandy region in northwestern France.

== Population ==
Historical population
Year	Pop.	±% p.a.
1968	377	—
1975	338	−1.55%
1982	317	−0.91%
1990	421	+3.61%
1999	450	+0.74%
2007	480	+0.81%
2012	500	+0.82%
2017	517	+0.67%
2023	482	−1.16%
Source: INSEE

== Administration ==
Ryes was the seat of the former canton of Ryes, which included 25 communes. Since 2015, it is part of the canton of Bayeux.

== Toponymy ==
In 1060, Ryes was mentioned under the name Rigia.

The ancient forms of its name are apparently related to the French word "raie" (Old French "roie"), deriving from the Gallo-Roman "rica", from the Gallic word "Rica" meaning a "furrow": cf. Middle Gallic "Rych", meaning a "groove", and Old Breton "rec" (modern Breton "rec'h"), meaning a "tear". The word occurred throughout the Gallo-Roman region and is attested in Low Latin in the forms "riga", "rega" and "rige" (FEW volume 10, pp. 393–394).

== History ==
Lord Hubert of Ryes welcomed Duke William during his struggle with his rebellious barons. He then saved William by sending him to Falaise escorted by his three sons while Hubert sent the rebellious barons in another direction.

On 1 July 1899, a 60 cm gauge shortline railroad between Courseulles and Bayeux was opened by Railways Calvados. The same day, a branch starting from Ryes to Arromanches also entered service. The main line and the branch were decommissioned from the network on 29 September 1932.

== See also ==
- Communes of the Calvados department
