= Rosary-based prayers =

Christian prayers that use rosary beads

Rosary-based prayers are Christian prayers recited on a set of rosary beads, among other cords. These prayers recite specific word sequences on the beads that make up the different sections. They may be directed to God the Father, Jesus Christ, or the Virgin Mary.

== Physical structure of a rosary ==
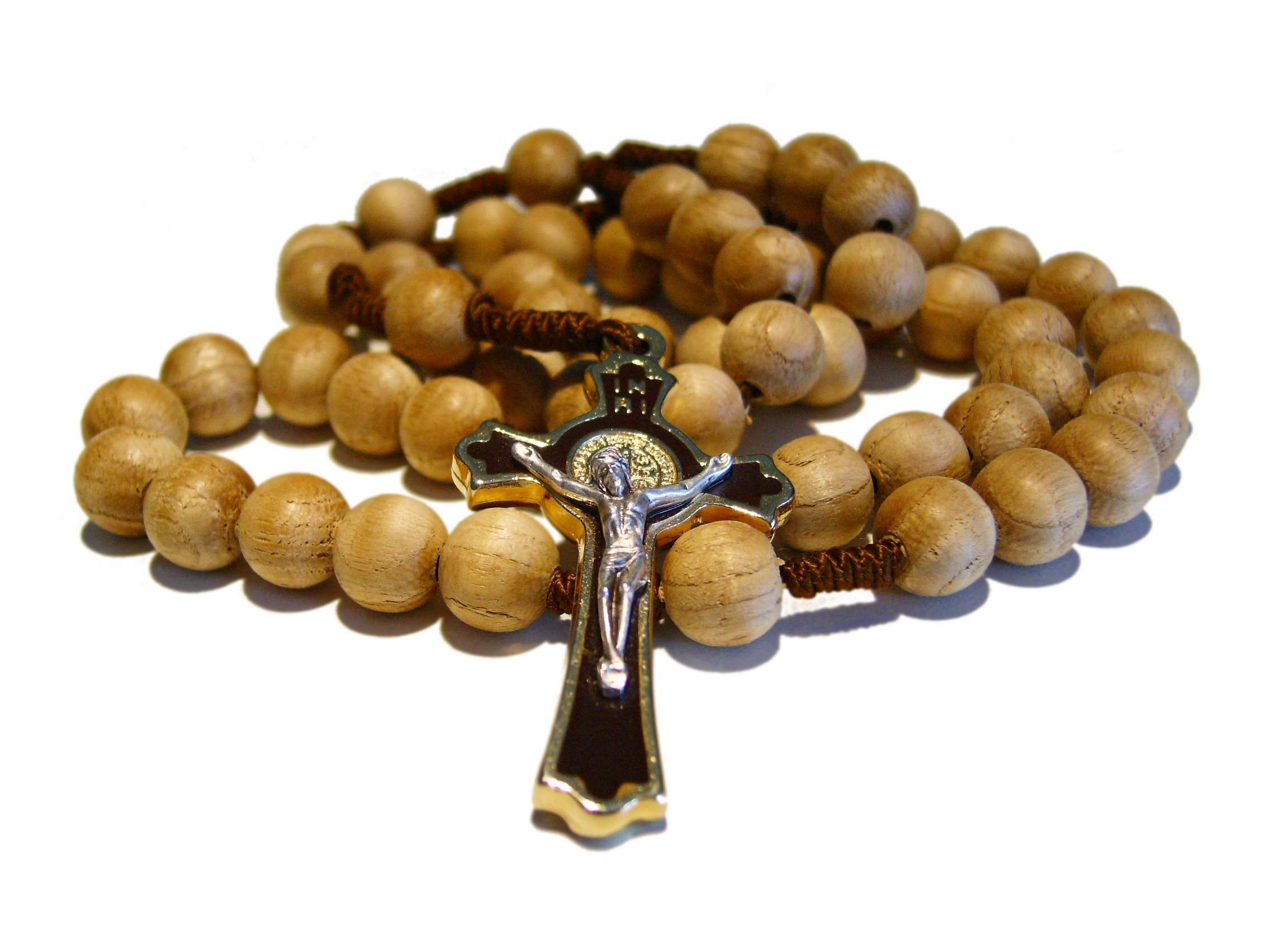
A rosary made of wooden beads.

The most common form of rosary is the Dominican Rosary. This is made up of a total of 59 beads, or sometimes knots, and a crucifix, perhaps with a small medallion. The main loop comprises 50 beads (often called Hail Mary beads and named for the prayer they are used to count) arranged as five groups of 10 closely spaced beads called decades. In between most of these decades and separated by a greater distance is a single bead (called an Our Father bead) which may be larger or otherwise distinctive. Attached between one pair of decades is a short string of five beads: three of them closely spaced, two others separated by a larger distance. At the bottom of this short string is a cross or a crucifix. This short string may attach to the main loop by a centrepiece in the form of a medallion bearing the image of a saint, a Sacred Heart, or some other symbol.

Many other rosaries follow this basic plan, often with one or two extra decades and a like number of single beads being added and perhaps a different number of beads on the pendant string. Small rosaries may comprise a single decade on the loop while retaining five beads and a cross on the pendant. Large Dominican Rosaries may have 169 beads to allow the recitation of 150 Hail Mary prayers without having to pass around the loop multiple times (the remaining 19 beads are fourteen Our Father beads on the loop with 5 beads on the pendant).

== Roman Catholic Rosaries ==
=== Dominican Rosary ===
The best known example of a rosary-based prayer is the Dominican Rosary which is ubiquitously called the Rosary. In traditional form it involves contemplation on fifteen Rosary mysteries (as three sets of five mysteries each), while Our Father, Hail Mary and Glory be to the Father prayers are recited.

This Rosary prayer goes back several centuries and there are differing views among experts on its exact history. In the 16th century, Pope Pius V established the current form of the original 15 mysteries for this Rosary and they remained so until the 20th century. Pope John Paul II proposed an additional set of five mysteries known as the "Luminous" mysteries as a manner of reflecting on Christ's life during his public ministry.

Further prayers specified in the Roman Catholic tradition include: the Fátima prayers, the Litany of the Blessed Virgin Mary and the Memorare of Bernard of Clairvaux.

==== Chaplet of the Divine Mercy ====
The Chaplet of the Divine Mercy was introduced and propagated by Faustina Kowalska, a Polish religious sister of the Congregation of the Sisters of Our Lady of Mercy. According to her diary (Diary 474-476), on 13 and 14 September 1935, this chaplet was dictated to her directly by Jesus Christ during visions when she was at the convent of Wilno (Vilnius). Faustina also said that Jesus granted several promises to the recitation of this chaplet.

The main focus of this prayer is to implore God the Father's mercy for the person praying and for the whole world, through the merits of the Passion of Christ. This prayer of God's mercy is centered on three themes: to obtain mercy, to trust in Christ's mercy, and to show mercy to others. The chaplet is prayed on ordinary rosary but according to the congregation, the chaplet should not be prayed the same way as an ordinary rosary: the decades should not be interspersed with meditations, intentions or any other prayers. Any intentions or texts are to be meditated upon at the beginning so that the entire prayer is said the way Jesus dictated it.

==== Carthusian Rosary ====
The Carthusian Rosary or Life of Christ Rosary developed by Dominic of Prussia comprises fifty recitations of Hail Mary each interpolated with a phrase stating a Christological or Mariological mystery. For example, "Hail Mary, full of grace, The Lord is with thee. Blessed art thou amongst women, And blessed is the fruit of thy womb, Jesus, whose feet were washed with Mary Magdalene's tears, dried with her hair, anointed with her perfume. Holy Mary, Mother of God, Pray for us sinners, Now and at the hour of our death. Amen." (Italic or oblique section indicating the inserted mystery.) At the time Dominic lived, the Hail Mary comprised only the first half of today's longer prayer—just "Hail Mary..." to "... thy womb, Jesus"—so he was adding his phrase to the end of the prayer.

There are fifty such phrases commended by Dominic and it acquired its alternative name as these cover the life of Jesus more completely than other Rosaries. While using all fifty meditative phrases is traditional, the Rosary is intended to be contemplative, invites silence for the contemplation, and quality is emphasised over quantity with no need to recite fifty prayers let alone needing to recite all fifty meditations.

The Carthusian Rosary is seen as an ancestor to the Dominican Rosary. Similar concept was also utilized in Montfort's Fourth method<ref="https://www.montfort.org.uk/Writings/MSR.php#Fourth"></ref>

==== Chaplet of the Immaculate Heart of Mary ====
The Rosary of Mary's Immaculate Heart is recited using an ordinary rosary.

==== Rosary of the Holy Wounds ====
The Rosary of the Holy Wounds was introduced at the beginning of the 20th century by Sister Mary Martha Chambon, a Roman Catholic nun of the Monastery of the Order of the Visitation of Holy Mary in Chambéry, France.

This Rosary specifically meditates on the wounds of Jesus Christ as an Act of Reparation for the sins of the world. This Rosary also focuses on prayers for souls in purgatory. Sister Mary Martha attributed the following purpose for the Rosary to Jesus: "you must not forget [...] the souls in Purgatory, as there are but few who think of their relief [...] The Holy Wounds are the treasure of treasures for the souls in Purgatory."

=== Bridgettine Crown ===
The Rosary as prayed by the Bridgettine and Discalced Carmelites orders is a loop containing six decades and five single beads, together with a short string of beads leading to the crucifix. It was propagated by Bridget of Sweden. It adds one additional mystery to each of the three traditional sets of Dominican mysteries: the Immaculate Conception is added as the sixth Joyful Mystery, Christ's body being removed from the cross is the sixth Sorrowful Mystery, the Virgin Mary being matron of the Bridgettine order is the sixth Glorious Mystery. An example of the Bridgettine Rosary may be seen depicted on the statue of the Crowned Virgin in the Sanctuary of Our Lady of Lourdes.

=== Chaplet of the Seven Sorrows ===
The Chaplet of the Seven Sorrows, which is also called the Rosary of the Seven Sorrows, the Rosary of the Seven Swords or the Servite Rosary, is a chaplet that originated with the Servite Order and is a form of devotion to the Seven Dolours of Mary and Our Lady of Sorrows.

In 1233, seven members of a Florentine Confraternity devoted to the Mother of God founded the Servite Order. According to tradition, the Virgin Mary appeared to the young men and exhorted them to devote themselves to her service. They retired on Monte Senario near Florence, where they experienced another vision of Mary. There they formed a new Order called the Servants of Mary, or Servites. In 1239, they took up the sorrows of Mary standing under the Cross, known as Our Lady of Sorrows, as the principal devotion of their order. The Servites developed the three most common devotions to Our Lady's Sorrows, one of which is the Rosary of the Seven Sorrows.

During the 18th century, a set of introductory prayers for the Servite Rosary was written by Alphonsus Liguori in his book The Glories of Mary.

Between 1981 and 1989, during the Marian apparitions of Our Lady of Kibeho in Kibeho, Rwanda, the Virgin Mary reportedly instructed one of the three recognized seers, Marie-Claire Mukangango, to spread the devotion to the Seven Sorrows Rosary. She also explained to her the graces associated with reciting the Rosary.

=== Franciscan Crown ===
In 1263, Bonaventure, Minister General of the Order, encouraged liturgical devotion honoring the mystery of the Visitation. The Franciscan Rosary, or as it is properly called, the Franciscan Crown and also known as the Rosary of the Seven Joys of Mary, developed in early part of the 15th century, and was officially established in 1422. The Franciscan Crown consists of seven decades of Hail Mary prayers, each preceded by an Our Father and followed by a Glory Be, and completed by two more Hail Marys after the 7th decade to complete the number 72 which is thought to be the age of Mary at the time of her Assumption. The Crown recalls the Seven Joys of Mary and how she responded to the grace of God in her life. These Seven Joys overlap with the Joyful and Glorious Mysteries of the Dominican Rosary. In addition to developing this Marian devotion, the Franciscans are credited with adding the final words to the Hail Mary: "Jesus. Holy Mary, Mother of God, pray for us sinners [from the writings of Bernardino of Siena] now and at the hour of our death [from the writings of the Servite Fathers and the Roman Breviary]."

=== St. Anthony's Rosary ===
The Irish people (specifically in the Gaeltacht areas) and their descendants in the global Irish diaspora have a tradition of saying 13 Aves rather than ten, in honour of Anthony of Padua, whose feast day is 13 June. Also called the St. Anthony Chaplet, its prayers are accompanied by a poem called the Miraculous Responsory or si quaeris, written by Bonaventure.

=== Trinitarian Rosary ===
The term "Trinitarian Rosary" is used for at least two different rosaries or chaplets.

==== Trisagion Rosary of the Trinitarian Order ====
First, it can refer to the special rosary or chaplet used by the Trinitarian Order (the Order of the Most Holy Trinity for the Redemption of Captives), which was founded in France in 1198. From an early date, the Trinitarians have used a form of prayer based on the Trisagion (sometimes Trisagium or Triagion, from the Greek 'thrice' + 'holy'). This is a Byzantine prayer in praise of the Trinity: its simplest form is "Holy God, Holy Strong One, Holy Immortal One, have mercy on us."

The Trisagion Rosary (usually called a chaplet) has three groups of nine beads. In reciting the chaplet, each group is preceded by the Trisagion and the Pater Noster. A special prayer is recited on each of the nine beads: "To you be praise, glory, and thanksgiving for ever, blessed Trinity. Holy, Holy, Holy, Lord God of power and might; heaven and earth are full of your glory." Each group of nine prayers is followed by a Gloria Patri ("Glory be to the Father, and the Son, and the Holy Spirit..."), and the whole ends with a closing prayer.

As with other rosaries that are special to a particular religious Order, its history is rather cloudy. The first question is how long the Trinitarians have used the Trisagion and its associated prayers. The prayers themselves are quite old, and may well have come to the Trinitarians from Byzantium through their connections in the Middle East. The Trisagion itself can be traced at least as far back as the Council of Chalcedon (451 AD) and perhaps further.

== Paternoster beads ==
In monastic houses of the Celtic Church in Gaelic Ireland, monks were expected to pray the Divine Office daily in Ecclesiastical Latin, the liturgical language of the Western Christian Church. Christian monastics, in addition to clergymen, "recited or chanted the 150 Psalms as a major source of hourly worship." To count these repetitions, they used beads strung upon a cord and this set of prayer beads became commonly known as a pater noster, which is the Latin for 'Our Father'.

In some houses, lay brothers who did not understand Latin or who were illiterate were required to say the Lord's Prayer (also referred to the "Our Father") a certain number of times each day while meditating on the Mysteries of the Incarnation of Christ. Lay people adopted this practice as a form of popular worship. In the eighth century the penitentials, or rule books pertaining to penitents, prescribed various penances of 20, 50, or more, paters. The strings of beads, with the aid of which such penances were accurately said, gradually came to be known as paternosters. The paternoster could be of various lengths, but was often made up of 5 "decades" of 10 beads, which when performed three times made up 150 prayers.

Today, some Anglican religious orders, such as the Solitaries of DeKoven, make and promulgate the Pater Noster Cord, in addition to other devotions such as the Anglican Rosary, as a part of Christian spiritual life.

== Ecumenical Miracle Rosary ==
The Ecumenical Miracle Rosary is prayed on the Roman Catholic rosary and is based upon the miracles of Jesus. The Ecumenical Miracle Rosary has gained a favourable response from Catholic, Protestant, and Orthodox Christians and is prayed by members of these denominations. The main features of the Ecumenical Rosary include praying the Nicene Creed on the crucifix or cross, praying a prayer known as "The Greatest Commandment" on "the three Hail Mary beads and all of the decades beads," and praying a prayer known as "The Great Commission"; when returning "to the medal at the end of the rosary," the Jesus Prayer is prayed.

== Eastern Christian chotki ==
While use of the Roman Catholic rosary has gradually been adopted by many Eastern Catholics, many Eastern Catholic churches have undertaken a campaign of liturgical de-Latinization, removing imported devotions and practices (such as the Rosary) that have obscured and replaced traditional and authentic devotions and practices of the Eastern Catholic Churches. Subsequently, the most common prayer used in the Eastern Christian Churches (Eastern Orthodox, Eastern Lutheran and Eastern Catholic) is the Jesus Prayer, which makes use of the more ancient prayer rope (chotki), a knotted rope (rather than beads) joined with a knotted cross. The prayer rope is not as fixed in form as the Western rosary (it may have 10, 33, 50, 100, or 500 knots on it), and it normally makes use of beads only as dividers between sections. The Eastern prayer rope is often divided into decades, but it may also be divided into sections of 25 or some other number, or not divided at all.

== Evangelical-Lutheran rosary ==
A number of Lutherans pray the Rosary, with two common formats that Evangelical-Lutherans use to pray the rosary. The traditional method used by Evangelical-Lutherans is largely the same as the way that Roman Catholics pray the rosary, though the Pre-Trent version of the Hail Mary is prayed (which omits "Holy Mary, mother of God, pray for us sinners, now and at the hour of our death"). Another version, envisaged in the 20th century, replaces the Hail Mary with the Jesus Prayer; the only time the "Hail Mary" is said is at the end of the Mysteries on the medal, where it is then replaced with the "Pre-Trent" version of the prayer (which omits "Holy Mary, mother of God, pray for us sinners, now and at the hour of our death"). The final prayer in the Evangelical-Lutheran rosary is the Pre-Trent Hail Mary, or alternatively, the Magnificat or Martin Luther's "Evangelical Praise of the Mother of God" may be used.

In addition to the rosary, the Wreath of Christ is a set of prayer beads used in Evangelical-Lutheranism; the Wreath of Christ contains 18 beads, which are known as "pearls", with many including a crucifix.

== Anglican Rosary ==
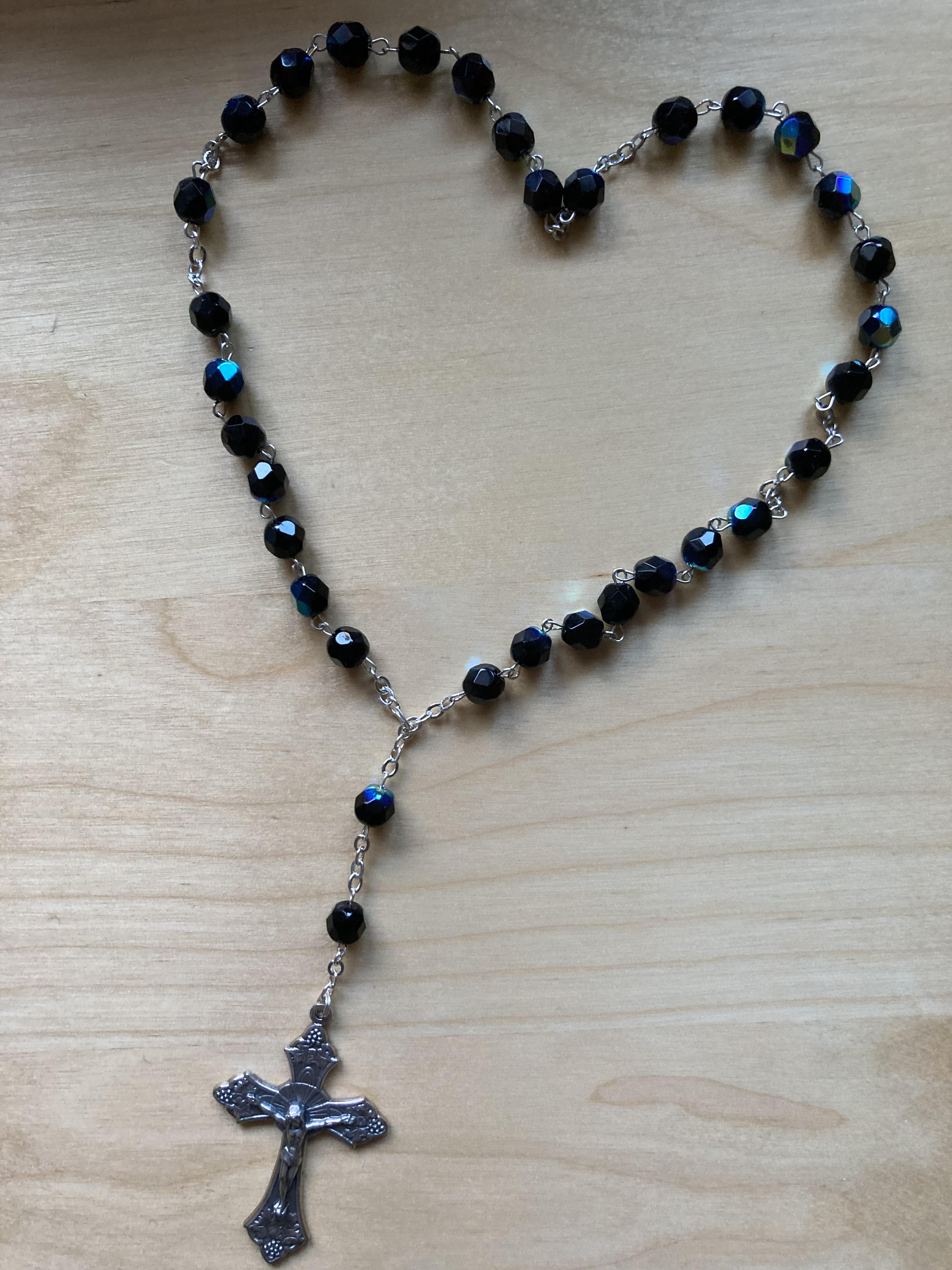
Anglican prayer beads

Among High Church Anglicans, Anglican prayer beads are sometimes used. This set is also known as the "Anglican Rosary" Anglican bead sets contain 28 beads in groups of seven called "weeks", with an additional large bead before each. In total, there are 33 beads representing the years of Jesus' life on Earth. A number of Anglicans use the Jesus Prayer, just like Eastern Christians, but there are no church-appointed prayers or meditations in the Anglican practice. Some Anglo-Catholics use the traditional Dominican Rosary.

== See also ==
- Prayer to Saint Joseph
- Chaplet (prayer)
- Prayer beads
- Wreath of Christ, "Lutheran Rosary"
