= Pater Noster cord =

Christian prayer beads

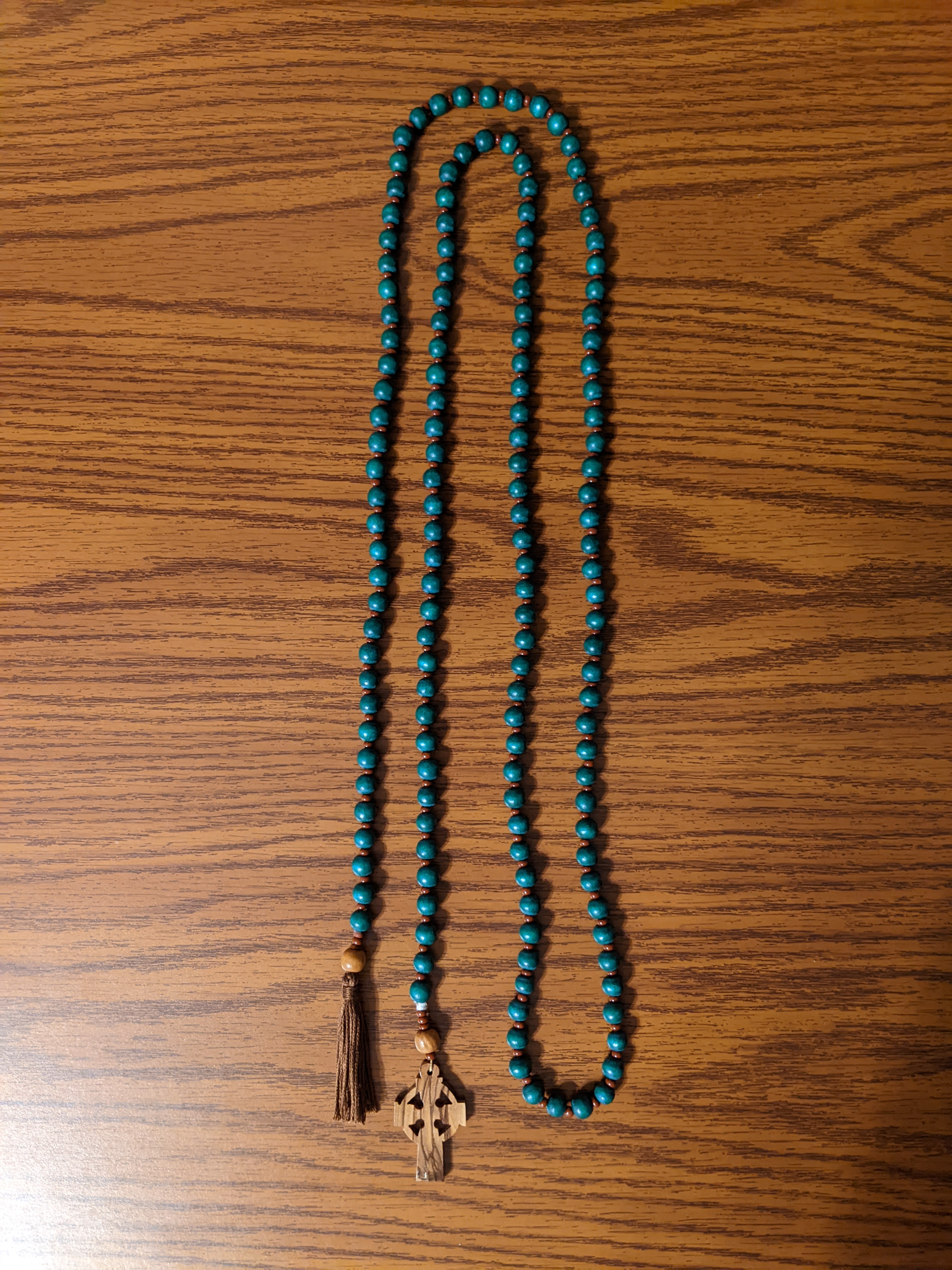
Pater Noster Cord containing 150 beads for the 150 Psalms in the Bible

The Pater Noster cord (also spelled Paternoster Cord and called Paternoster beads) is a set of Christian prayer beads used to recite the 150 Psalms, as well as the Lord's Prayer. As such, Paternoster cords traditionally consist of 150 beads that are prayed once or 50 beads that are prayed thrice. One end of the Paternoster cord has a Christian cross and the other end has a tassel.

== History ==
The Pater Noster cord was used in Gaelic Ireland, often sung in the form of Celtic chant. In the medieval era, persons who were illiterate simply recited the Lord's Prayer (known as the Pater Noster in the Ecclesiastical Latin liturgical language) 150 times instead of the 150 Psalms, hence giving these Christian prayer beads the name of the Paternoster cord: according to 'Solitaries of DeKoven', "Monks and clergy recited or chanted the Psalms as a major source of hourly worship. People living near the monasteries/abbeys realized the beauty of this devotion but unable to read or memorize the lengthy Psalms, the people were unable to adapt this form of prayer for their use. It was suggested that the people might substitute 150 Our Fathers in place of the Psalms."

=== Development and use ===
In 3rd century Roman Egypt, the Coptic Rite Desert Fathers in Scetes carried pebbles in pouches to count their praying of the Psalms. The Pater Noster Cord, however, originated in the 8th century Celtic Church in Gaelic Ireland as a means to count the recitation of the one hundred and fifty Psalms in the Christian Bible, which are incorporated into the fixed prayer times of Christianity. Those who could not read or had difficulty memorizing the canonical hours prayed the Lord's Prayer one hundred and fifty times. Ropes of 150 knots prayed once or ropes of 50 knots (to be counted thrice) were made, giving the Pater Noster Cord its current form. The use of the Paternoster Cords spread throughout Western Christendom.

The oldest examples to be found were discovered by archaeologists during an excavation of the Celtic monastery on Lindisfarne in 2022: made of Atlantic salmon vertebrae, they are believed date from the 8th- or 9th-century.

The Pater Noster cord has been carried by Christians who wear it off of their girdle or belt, or also hang it off of "the neck or wrist or arm". Others have worn the Pater Noster cord by attaching it to a brooch worn on the breast, or simply carrying it in their hand.

According to the Cogadh Gaedhel re Gallaibh, the elderly Brian Boru, High King of Ireland, spent the day before his death at the hands of Viking mercenary Brodir during the Battle of Clontarf in 1014 away from combat, kneeling upon a cushion, and singing 50 Psalms, 50 paters, 50 aves, and then reciting the next 50 Psalms using a Pater Noster cord.

=== Assemblage ===
The making of Paternoster Cords in the Middle Ages was done by guilds who were distinguished based on the kind of materials they used to assemble them ("coral and shell, amber and jet, or bone and horn").

== Present day ==
In the present day, religious orders such as the Solitaries of DeKoven (a community of Anglican hermits) make Pater Noster cords to support themselves.

== See also ==
- Breviary
- Chotki
- Lestovka
- Rosary
- Rosary-based prayers
