= Protestant prayer beads =

Protestant prayer beads may refer to:

- Anglican prayer beads, used by Anglicans and other Protestants, such as Methodists
- Wreath of Christ, used by Lutherans
