= Virginia Gray =

Virginia Gray may refer to:

- Virginia Gray (political scientist), American political scientist
- Virginia Gray Henry Blakemore, American writer and filmmaker
- Virginia Gray, the mayor of Wendell, North Carolina
- Virginia Gray, a character from the television series Heroes

See also:

- Virginia Grey, American actress
