= Islamic Texts Society =

Educational charity based in Cambridge, UK

- Founded: 1981
- Country of origin: United Kingdom
- Headquarters location: Cambridge
- Distribution: Worldwide
- Publication types: Books
- Nonfiction topics: Islam, Islamic legal studies (fiqh), Sufism
- Official website: www.its.org.uk

The Islamic Texts Society (ITS) is a peer-reviewed, British publishing house which concentrates on academic and general titles on Islam. It is registered as an educational charity in the UK.

== History ==
The Islamic Texts Society was founded in Cambridge, United Kingdom, in 1981, by a group of scholars including Aisha Gray Henry. Since its inception, ITS has worked in collaboration with scholars including Prince Ghazi bin Muhammad, David Burrell, Mohammad Hashim Kamali, Martin Lings, Seyyed Hossein Nasr, Eric Ormsby, and Timothy Winter (Abdal Hakim Murad).

=== Imprints ===
The ITS also had an imprint, Quinta Essentia, focused on symbolism, the arts, and universal spirituality. This has since been transferred to the American publisher Fons Vitae.

== Notable publications ==
The Islamic Texts Society has published over sixty titles, including the bestselling biography by Martin Lings, Muhammad: His Life Based on the Earliest Sources, and key works on Hadith studies, Islamic jurisprudence and Sufism. The long-term aim of the Islamic Texts Society is to provide a comprehensive English library on Islam and its various disciplines.

One project of the ITS is the “Ghazali Series”, aiming to publish in English works of Muhammad Abu Hamid al-Ghazali. Two of its volumes won the British Book Design and Production Award (best general paperback) in 1991 and 1993.

Another ITS project is the “Fundamental Rights and Liberties in Islam Series”, which includes several studies by Mohammad Hashim Kamali.

== See also ==
- List of publishers
