= Martin Lönnebo =

Swedish clergyman (1930–2023)

The Right Reverend Martin Lönnebo
- Bishop Emeritus of Linköping
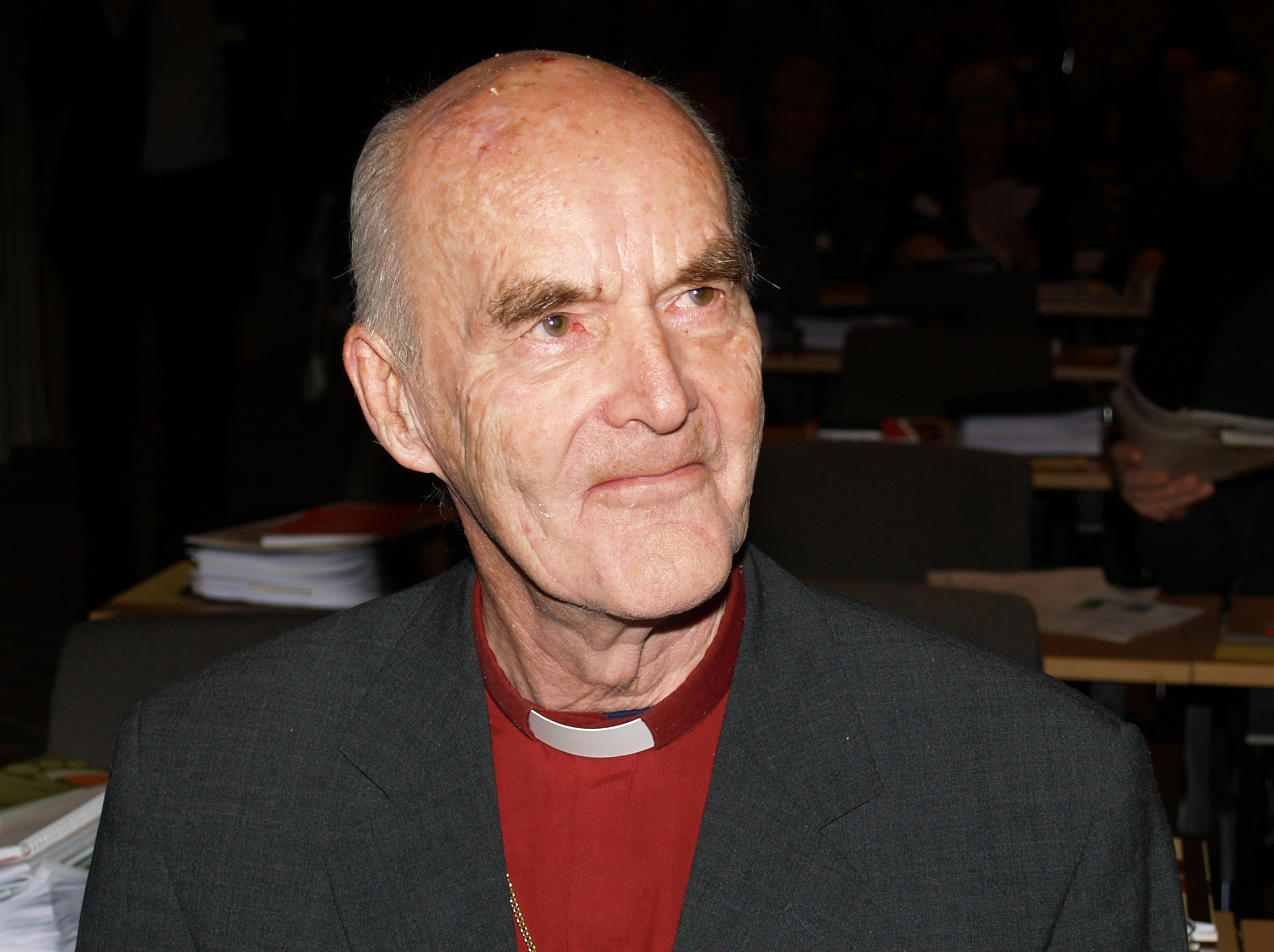
- Lönnebo in 2007
- Church: Church of Sweden
- Diocese: Diocese of Linköping
- In office: 1980–1995
- Predecessor: Ragnar Askmark
- Successor: Martin Lind

Personal details
- Born: 27 February 1930 Storkågeträsk, Sweden
- Died: 26 April 2023 (aged 93) Linköping, Sweden
- Coat of arms

Karl Martin Lönnebo (27 February 1930 – 26 April 2023) was a Swedish clergyman who served as Bishop of the diocese of Linköping from 1980 to 1994.

Lönnebo was born in Storkågeträsk in present-day Skellefteå Municipality. He studied theology at Johannelund theological seminary and was ordained within the Swedish Evangelical Mission (Evangeliska Fosterlands-Stitelsen, EFS) in 1954. In 1964 he received a D.Th. degree on his doctoral dissertation Albert Schweitzers etisk-religiösa ideal. He worked as a pastor and chaplain in Uppsala for a number of years, and was appointed Provost (domprost) of Härnösand in 1977. In 1980 he was elected Bishop of Linköping, where he remained until his retirement.

Lönnebo also wrote a number of books on religious life, many of them inspired by the spiritual traditions of northern Sweden, as well as by Eastern Christianity.

In 1993 he was awarded an honorary doctorate (PhD) at Linköping University.

In 1995, Lönnebo created the Wreath of Christ, a set of non-denominational prayer beads with 18 pearls to be used for meditation and devotional practices.

Lönnebo married Britt-Louise Ollikainen in 1958. They had three children.

Lönnebo died in Linköping on 26 April 2023, at the age of 93.
