= Muhammad: His Life Based on the Earliest Sources =

1983 book by Martin Lings

- The cover of the 1991 edition
- Author: Martin Lings
- Language: English
- Series: 1st Edition (1983); 2nd Edition (1991)
- Subject: Biography
- Genre: Non-fiction
- Publisher: Islamic Texts Society (1991), Inner Traditions (2006)
- Publication date: 1 January 1983
- Publication place: United Kingdom
- Media type: Print
- Pages: 362
- ISBN: 978-0946621330
- OCLC: 9195533

Muhammad: His Life Based on the Earliest Sources is a 1983 biography of the Islamic prophet Muhammad by Martin Lings.

== Overview ==
The book provides a new account of the Sira or the life of Muhammad, with details that had not been elaborated in other accounts. It is based primarily on old Arab sources that go back to the 9th century, of which some passages are translated for the first time. It is not contradictory to other accounts but rather offers new insights and new details. The book also includes excerpts from original English translations of speeches by men and women who lived close to Muhammad, heard him speak, witnessed his actions, witnessed the way he interacted with situations and witnessed events he encountered throughout various stages of his life.

References used are Ibn Ishaq (references here are to Ferdinand Wüstenfeld's edition of Sirat Rasul Allah, a life of the Prophet by Muhammad ibn Ishaq in the annotated recension of Ibn Hisham). Also Ibn Sa’ad (the references are to John Leyden's edition of Kitab al-Tabaqat al Kabir by Muhammad ibn Sa’d). Also there is Al-Waqidi (and the references are to Marsden Jones' edition of Kitab al Maghazi, A Chronicle of the Prophet's Campaigns, by Muhammad ibn Umar al- Waqidi).

It is a narrative of the history of Arabia and the birth and the life of Muhammad. The biography consists of 85 short chapters, some as short as just two pages in length. Each chapter deals with an important event in the history of Islam and provides chronological context for the advent of the religion, as well as detailed information about Muhammad.

The biography has gone through many reprints in English and it has been translated and published into many languages including French, Italian, Spanish, Turkish, Dutch, Malay and Tamil.

== Style ==
A distinctive element of the biography is the vivid, approachable narrative style, which is fast moving and flows fluently. The book reads more like a novel and was written in a style, which is easily readable, comprehensible and it uses language, which reflects both simplicity and grandeur.

Lings uses a more archaic style of English to depict conversations and translations of the Qur'an, which helps slows down the rapid flow of the narration. The focus in the book is less about the teachings of Islam and more about Muhammad.

== 1991 edition ==
In 1991, a second revised edition of the book with 22 additional pages was published, containing additional details pertaining to Muhammad's endeavours as well as accounts covering the spread of Islam into Syria and its neighbouring states surrounding the Arabian Peninsula.

== 2006 edition ==
Before Lings died in 2005, a newly revised edition of the book with 22 additional pages was published, which included final updates made on the text and incorporated into its contents, containing extra details pertaining to Muhammad's endeavors as well as accounts covering the spread of Islam into Syria and its neighboring states surrounding the Arabian Peninsula.

== Critical reception ==
Hamza Yusuf hails this work as "one of the great biographies of the English language," praising "the historical accuracy of the text and the providential care so evident in the author's choice of versions as well as the underlying structure of the story as he chose to tell it." He also reports from Lings how while writing this book, "he was overwhelmed with the presence of the Prophet during the entire time and felt a great blessing in having been able to complete it."

The Spectator described the book as "an enthralling story that combines impeccable scholarship with a rare sense of the sacred worthy of his subject." The Islamic Quarterly called the book "a true work of art, as enthralling as the best novels with the difference that this is not fiction but fact." The Times said "this work is widely recognized as the most readable account of the life of the Prophet to date." Parabola stated that "for those interested in Islam in one way or another, it is mesmerizing."

Khalid Yahya writes that Lings' book brings early Islamic accounts, many of which are scattered, into a single narrative according to Ibn Ishaq's chronological scheme. According to Yahya, Lings successfully presents what most Muslims believe, and have believed throughout history, about Muhammad. W. Montgomery Watt agrees that Lings' book gives an idea of how Muhammad is seen by Muslims. He points out that the book was based on the earliest Islamic sources, and where there is a difference of opinion in those sources, the book takes the most widely accepted view; and that Lings simply accepts the early Islamic sources without discussing their value.

Asma Asfaruddin said the book is a rare example of "a gift of narration wedded to impeccable scholarship".

Upon its first edition, the book was subject to criticism by some Muslims who decried the "Perennialist poison" in the book. The author gave public answer in a Saudi newspaper to the objections.

== Awards ==
In 1983, the book was selected as the best biography of Muhammad in English at the National Seerat Conference in Islamabad. This book was also given "National Seerah Award" by the government of Pakistan.

In 1990, after the book had attracted the attention of Azhar University, Lings received a decoration from Egyptian president Hosni Mubarak.

== See also ==
- Prophetic biography
- List of biographies of Muhammad
