= Martin Lind =

The Right Reverend Martin Lind PhD
- Bishop Emeritus of Linköping; Bishop Emeritus of the Lutheran Church in Great Britain
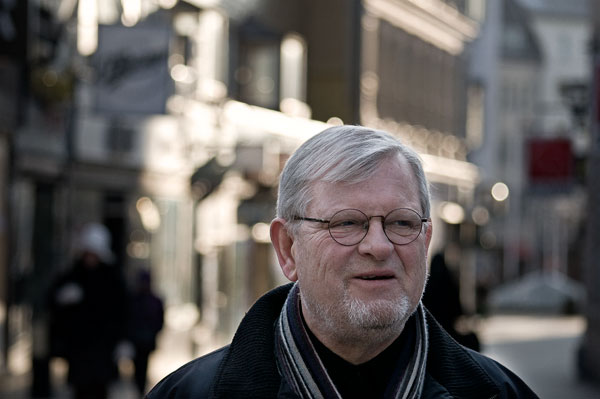
- Bishop Lind in Linköping, 2011
- Predecessor: Martin Lönnebo
- Successor: Martin Modéus
- Previous post: Dean of Uppsala Cathedral

Orders
- Ordination: 1966
- Consecration: 23 April 1995 by Gunnar Weman

Personal details
- Born: 14 March 1944 (age 82) Malmö, Sweden
- Denomination: Lutheranism
- Spouse: Hilda Elisabet Blomstrand (m. 1968; died 2016); Karin Rhode (m. 2019)
- Education: University of Lund
- Motto: Gud är barmhärtig ("God is merciful")
- Coat of arms

Martin Claes Lind is bishop emeritus of the Diocese of Linköping in the Church of Sweden and former bishop of the Lutheran Church in Great Britain. He was Bishop of Linköping from 1 February 1995 to 2 March 2011. He was appointed bishop of the Lutheran Church in Great Britain in January 2014 and retired in 2019.

== Youth and education ==
As a teenager, Lind was active in the Malmö Christian Upper Secondary School Students' Association (Malmö KGF), which he chaired. At the same time, he was active in the Societas Sanctae Birgittae, but shortly after his ordination, he left this society. He was ordained a priest in 1966 for the Diocese of Lund at age 22. This required a dispensation from the Swedish Government as he was under the required age for ordination. He was active in the Christian Student Association in Lund and became its president in Autumn 1966. He was chair of the Christian Student Movement in Sweden (KRISS) from 1972–1977.

In 1968, Lind was a participant at the World Council of Churches (WCC) Fourth General Assembly in Uppsala. During the Assembly, he was, with Professor Per Frostin of the University of Lund, co-editor of a youth magazine Hot News published daily during the Assembly by an international and ecumenical editorial team of young academics. The equivalent of Hot News has been published during all subsequent WCC general assemblies.

In autumn 1968, Lind participated in an anti-apartheid campaign at Lund Cathedral during a visit by a large group of foreign diplomats, including representatives of the South African apartheid regime. When the group arrived at the cathedral, they were met with the students singing "We Shall Overcome" using the verse "black and white together". In spring 1969, Lind was charged along with four others for disorderly conduct and he was required to pay a fine.

== Academic and episcopal career in Sweden ==
Lind received his PhD in theology at the University of Lund in 1975 for a thesis on Christianity and Nazism. He then became an associate professor of systematic theology at the same university in 1976. From 1978 to 1980, he worked as a teacher in India at Tamil Nadu Theological Seminary funded by the Church of Sweden. During his last year at the seminary, he was appointed vice rector and had overall responsibility for teaching in Lutheran theology within the ecumenical seminary.

After returning to Sweden, Lind served as a pastor from 1980 to 1983 at the Kävlinge Parish Church in the Diocese of Lund. From 1983 to 1990, Lind served as acting rector then rector of the Church of Sweden's Pastoral Institute in Lund. In 1990, he was appointed dean of Uppsala Cathedral. He was an elected member of the General Synod from 1983 to 1995. Since 1983, Lind has been a member of the Church of Sweden's Doctrinal Committee. In 1984 he was elected vice chair of the Church of Sweden's Council for Inter-Church and Ecumenical Relations. He was appointed bishop of the Diocese of Linköping on 1 February 1995 by the Swedish Government. He was consecrated a bishop by Archbishop of Uppsala Gunnar Weman on 23 April 1995. As a bishop, Lind remained a member of the General Synod ex officio.

Lind is committed to the church's presence in the public discourse, to the ecumenical movement towards Christian unity, church renewal through new kinds of worship, and for rediscovering the tradition of pilgrimage. In 1997, Lind opened the Nordic Pilgrim Center in Vadstena. Bishop Lind has in recent years been involved in Christian-Muslim dialogue. In 2008, he founded the Interfaith Council of Östergötland and Northern Småland. The Council comprises representatives of Islam, Judaism and various Christian traditions. In the debate on the place of LGBT persons in the church, Lind was the first bishop to call for same-sex marriage to be performed in the Church of Sweden. In 2009, the General Synod approved same-sex marriage in the church.

Lind is an active Swedish Social Democrat and has held various ecclesiastical-political roles for the Social Democrats. Since 1997, he has been a member of the Swedish Academy of Gastronomy.

== Lutheran Church in Great Britain ==
As bishop of the Lutheran Church in Great Britain (LCiGB), Lind presided over the denomination's entry into the Porvoo Communion of Churches in a ceremony held at the chapel of Bishopthorpe Palace, the residence of the archbishop of York. On 14 September 2014, Lind signed the document at this ceremony that brought the LCiGB into full communion with the Anglican churches of Britain and Ireland: the Church of England, the Church of Ireland, the Church in Wales, and the Scottish Episcopal Church.

== Spouses ==
Lind was married to Hilda Elisabet Lind, née Blomstrand (1943–2016), who was active in the Church of Sweden at a national level serving as its director of mission at the church headquarters in Uppsala. She was first chairperson of the Swedish Church Women's Council (1992–1995) and chair of Women in the Church of Sweden (Kvinnor Svenska kyrkan) (2009-2015). She was also chair of the Association of Christian Humanism. She was the author of several books. She died after a year-long battle with cancer on Ascension Day, 5 May 2016.

On 6 January 2019, Lind married Karin Rodhe (born 1944), a medical doctor and psychiatrist.

== Bibliography ==
- With God we live without God: Reflections and prayers inspired by the writings of Dietrich Bonhoeffer, Durham: Sacristy Press, 2018 (978-1-910519-93-6)
- Med Gud lever vi utan Gud: 30 texter med inspiration från Dietrich Bonhoeffer, Varberg: Argument Förlag, 2017. Title in English: see above.
- Salt, bröd och vin: en pilgrimsteologi, Stockholm: Verbum, 2011. Title in English: Salt, Bread and Wine: A Pilgrim Theology
- Dietrich Bonhoeffer: tankar om en 1900-talsmartyr, Stockholm: Verbum, 2006. Title in English: Dietrich Bonhoeffer: Thoughts of a Twentieth Century Martyr
- Mänskligt och meningsfullt: kristen tro idag (medförfattare med Hilda Lind), Stockholm: Verbum, 1985. Title in English: Human and Meaningful: the Christian Faith Today (co-authored with Hilda Lind)
- Kristendom och Nazism, Lund: University of Lund, 1975. Title in English: Christianity and Nazism

Evangelical Lutheran Church titles
| Preceded by Martin Lönnebo | Bishop of Linköping; 1995–2011 | Succeeded by Martin Modéus |
| Preceded by Jāna Jēruma-Grīnberga | Bishop of the Lutheran Church in Great Britain; 2014–2019 | Succeeded by Tor Berger Jørgensen |
