= Mohammad Hashim Kamali =

Afghan legal scholar (born 1944)

Mohammad Hashim Kamali محمد هاشم کمالي
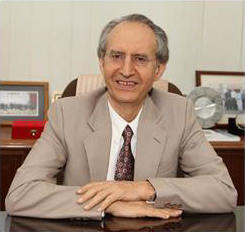
- Born: 7 February 1944 (age 82); Nangarhar Province, Afghanistan
- Occupation: Islamic scholar

Mohammad Hashim Kamali (Pashto/Dari: محمد هاشم کمالي ; born 7 February 1944) is an Afghan Islamic scholar and former professor of law at the International Islamic University of Malaysia. He taught Islamic law and jurisprudence between 1985 and 2004. One author has described him as "the most widely read living author on Islamic law in the English language."

== Education ==
Kamali studied his BA at University of Kabul and completed his LL.M.. in comparative law from The London School of Economics and Political Science, and a PhD in Islamic and Middle Eastern law at the University of London, 1969–1976.

== Academic career ==
Kamali served as Professor of Islamic law and jurisprudence at the International Islamic University Malaysia, and also as Dean of the International Institute of Islamic Thought & Civilisation (ISTAC) from 1985 to 2007. He currently is the chairman of the Institute for Law and Society (ILSAF).

In 2000 he published Islamic Commercial Law: An Analysis of Futures and Options, an analysis of options and futures contracts as trading tools from the point of view of shariah. The book is divided into three parts: the first describes derivatives trading in its nuts-and-bolts in secular terms. The second part looks at the issue of whether futures trading is permissible in Islamic law, and concludes that it is, due to the principle of maslaha, i.e. consideration of the public interest. The third part of the book draws the same conclusion with regard to options. Businessman Mohammed Amin recommended the book.

== Publications ==
- Freedom of Expression in Islam (1994)
- Principles of Islamic Jurisprudence (Reprint, Petaling Jaya, 1999)
- Islamic Commercial Law (Cambridge: Islamic Texts Society, 2000)
- A Textbook of Hadith Studies (Islamic Foundation, UK, 2005)
- An Introduction to Shari’ah (Oneworld Publications, Oxford 2008)
- Shari'ah Law: An Introduction (Viva Books 2009)
- “Constitutionalism in Islamic Countries: A Contemporary Perspective of Islamic Law,” in: Constitutionalism in Islamic Countries: Between Upheaval and Continuity (eds. Rainer Grote and Tilmann Röder, Oxford University Press, Oxford/New York 2011)
- Moderation and balance in Islam: The Qurʼānic Principle of Wasatiyyah (Oxford University Press, Oxford/New York, 2010)
- The Middle Path of Moderation in Islam: The Qurʼānic Principle of Wasatiyyah (Oxford University Press, Oxford/New York, 2015)
