= Eric Ormsby =

American poet and academic (born 1941)

- Born: Eric Linn Ormsby; Atlanta, Georgia, United States

Philosophical work
- Institutions: Institute of Ismaili Studies
- Main interests: Poetry, literature, Islamic philosophy
- Website: Homepage

Eric Linn Ormsby (born 1941 in Atlanta, Georgia) is deputy head of academic research and publications at the Institute of Ismaili Studies in London. He was formerly the Director of Libraries and a professor at McGill University Institute of Islamic Studies, where he also served as director. He has published widely on Islamic thought, including Theodicy in Islamic Thought (1984).

Ormsby has had six collections of poetry published, including Bavarian Shrine and Other Poems (1990), which won a Quebec prize for the best poetry of that year. His poems have been published in The New Yorker and The Paris Review, and have been anthologized in The Norton Anthology of Poetry.

== Selected works ==
- The Silent Qur'an and the Speaking Qur'an: Scriptural Sources of Islam Between History and Fervor (translation of Mohammad Amir-Moezzi's influential work in Persian). Columbia University Press. 2016.
- Between Reason and Revelation: Twin Wisdoms Reconciled (An Annotated English Translation of Nasir-i Khusraw's Kitāb-i Jāmiʿ al-ḥikmatayn). I. B. Tauris. 2012.
- Al-Ghazali on Love, Longing, Intimacy and Contentment (Kitab al-Mahabba wa'l-shawq wa'l-uns wa'l-rida). Cambridge, Islamic Texts Society. 2011.
- Baboons of Hada. Carcanet Press. 2011.
- Fine Incisions: Essays on Poetry and Place. Porcupine's Quill. 2010.
- Ghazali. Oneworld Publications. 2007. pp. 160 pp.
- Time's Covenant. Biblioasis. 2006. pp. 300 pp.
- Daybreak at the Straits and Other Poems. Zoo Press. 2004. pp. 72 pp.
- Facsimiles of Time:Essays on Poetry and Translation. Porcupine's Quill. 2001. pp. 256 pp.
- Araby. Véhicule Press. 2001. pp. 112 pp.
- For a Modest God. Grove Press. 1997. pp. 139 pp.
- Coastlines. ECW Press. 1992.
- Bavarian Shrine. ECW Press. 1990. ISBN 978-1-55022-107-7.
- Moses Maimonides and His Time. Catholic University of America Press. 1989.
- Handlist of Arabic manuscripts (new series) in the Princeton University Library / by Rudolf Mach & Eric L. Ormsby. Princeton University Press. 1987.
- Theodicy in Islamic Thought : the Dispute over al-Ghazālī's "best of all possible worlds". Princeton University Press. 1984.
- West-Eastern Divan: Complete, annotated new translation, including Goethe’s ‘Notes and Essays’ & the unpublished poems, translated by Eric Ormsby, 2019. Gingko
