= Prayer beads =

String of beads used in various religious traditions

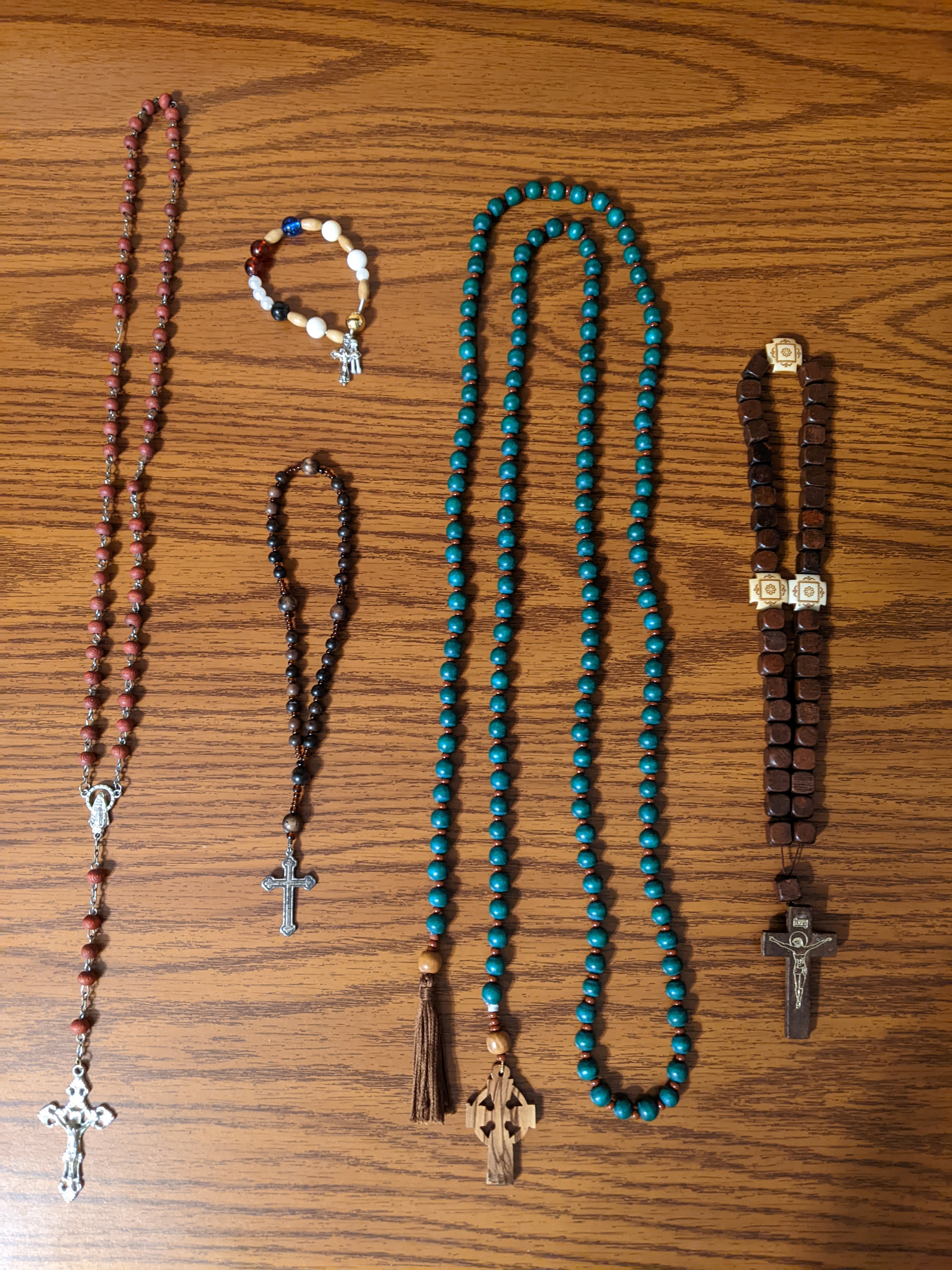
The image depicts several Christian prayer beads; from left to right are a Roman Catholic Dominican rosary, a Lutheran Wreath of Christ, a set of Anglican prayer beads, a Celtic Church Pater Noster cord, and a Coptic Orthodox mequteria.

Prayer beads are a form of beadwork used to count the repetitions of prayers, chants, or mantras by members of various religions such as Christian denominations (such as the Roman Catholic Church, the Lutheran Church, the Anglican Church, the Oriental Orthodox Churches, and the Eastern Orthodox Churches), Hinduism, Jainism, Buddhism, Shinto, Umbanda, Sikhism, the Baháʼí Faith, and Islam. Prayer beads may also be used by some Sephardi or Mizrahi Jews. Common forms of beaded devotion include the mequteria in Oriental Orthodox Christianity, the chotki or komposkini or prayer rope in Eastern Orthodox Christianity, the Wreath of Christ in Lutheran Christianity, the Dominican rosary of the Blessed Virgin Mary in Roman Catholic Christianity, the japamala in Buddhism and Hinduism, the Jaap Sahib in Sikhism and the misbaha in Islam.

== Origins and etymology ==
Beads are among the earliest human ornaments and ostrich eggshell beads in Africa date to 10,000 BC. Over the centuries various cultures have made beads from a variety of material from stone and shells to clay. First instance of counting strings, in form of a primitive abacus, can be traced back to Sumerian era, which was called "gu-dili-a(–e3), which occurs in Let. 3.3.17 (Letter of Lugal-ibila to Lugal-nisag) in a broken context, translating it as ‘to string together on a single thread’", a fixed bead abacus might also have been used passage from In-nin-ša3-gur4-ra (ex. 9) describes strings with beads as hanging down similar to Assyrian counting string abacus that was called "mahisatu" functioned similar to tally sticks.

The English word bead descends from the Old English noun bede 'prayer'. The oldest image of a string of beads in a religious context and resembling a string of prayer beads is found on the fresco of the "Adorants" (or "Worshipers") at the Xeste 3 building of the prehistoric settlement of Akrotiri, Santorini (Thera), Greece (Wall Paintings of Thera), dating from the 17th century BC (c. 1613 BC). It was used in Hindu prayers and meditation in India. Buddhism later on adopted this custom.. The statue of a Hindu holy man with beads dates to the third century BC.

A string of prayer beads is sometimes called a rosary. The name comes from when the beads were made of rose petals crushed into a paste. The uncoated rosary beads leave a floral scent on the hands when run between the fingers in prayer. The technique continues into the 2020s both in ancient churches with rose gardens and as a business or hobby craft. Some rosaries can smell gently of roses hundreds of years later.

== Structure ==
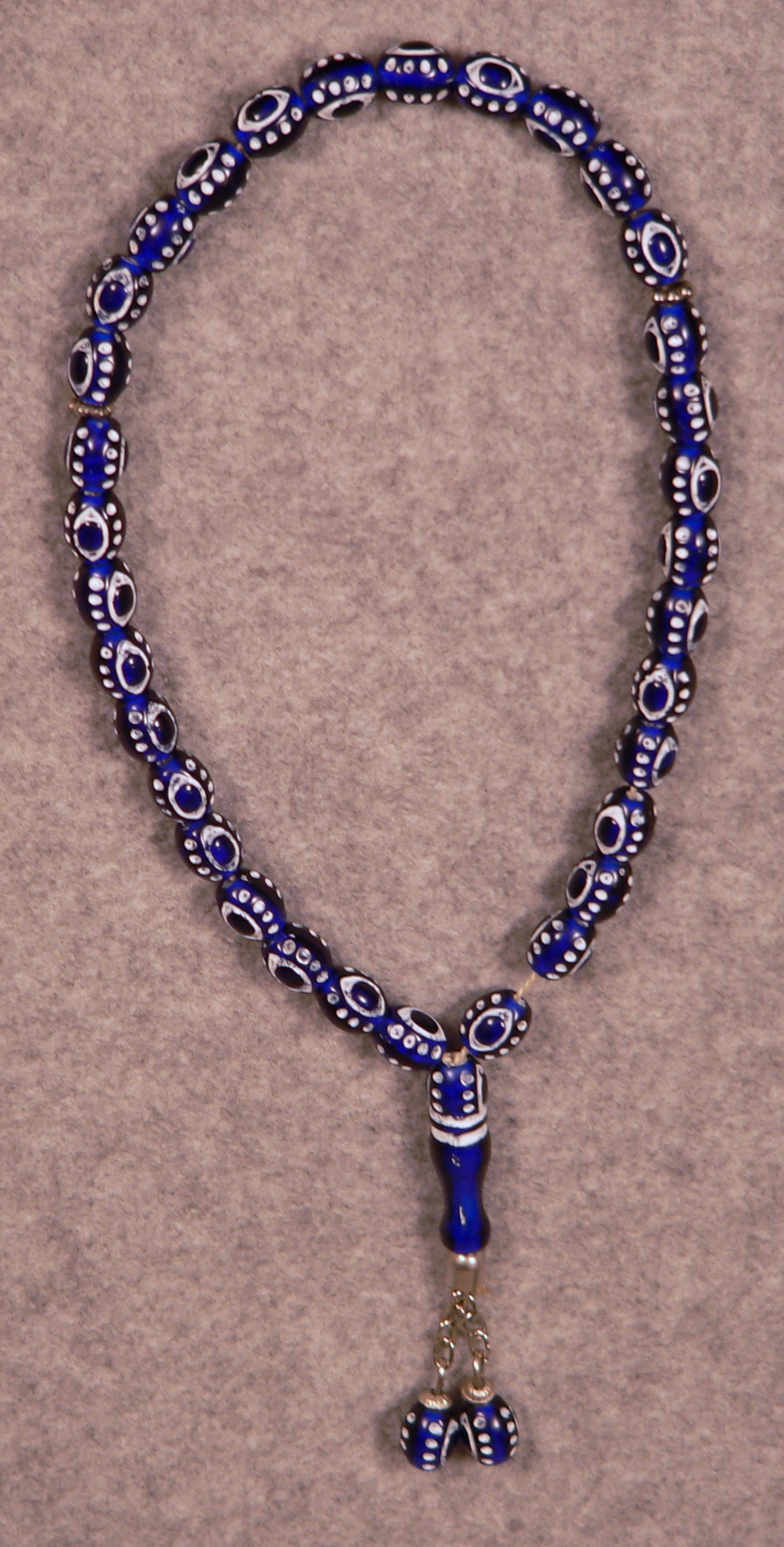
A misbaha, a device used for counting tasbih

The number of beads varies by religion or use. Islamic prayer beads, called Misbaha or Tasbih, usually have 100 beads (99 +1 = 100 beads in total or 33 beads read thrice and +1). Buddhists and Hindus use the Japa Mala, which usually has 108 beads, or 27 which are counted four times. Baháʼí prayer beads consist of either 95 beads or 19 beads, which are strung with the addition of five beads below. The Sikh Mala also has 108 beads.

The oldest set of prayer beads in Western Christianity, the Pater Noster cord, traditionally contains 150 beads for the 150 Psalms in the Bible, though Pater Noster cords of 50 beads have been made that are prayed through thrice. Roman Catholics came to use the Rosary (Latin "rosarium", meaning "rose garden") with 59 beads. The Oriental Orthodox mequteria, chiefly used by Coptic Orthodox Christians and Ethiopian Orthodox Christians, contains 41 beads for praying the Kyrie Eleison said during the 41 metanoias (prostrations) in each of the Christian seven fixed prayer times (cf. Agpeya breviary). Eastern Orthodox Christians and Eastern Catholic Christians use a knotted prayer rope called either a komboskini or chotki, with 100 knots, although prayer ropes with 50 or 33 knots can also be used. The Lutheran Wreath of Christ contains 18 beads. In the 1980s, Rev. Lynn Bauman from the Protestant Episcopal Church in the United States of America introduced Anglican prayer beads with 33 beads.

== Use ==
Since the beads are fingered in an automatic manner, they allow the user to keep track of how many prayers have been said with a minimal amount of conscious effort, which in turn allows greater attention to the prayer itself.

=== Judaism ===
Although the use of prayer beads grew within other religions, it did not enter Judaism, perhaps because of its association with those religions, and to date Judaism does not normally use prayer beads. Although not used as counting device, many Jews touch the knots on the tzitzits attached to their tallit (prayer shawl) at specific points in their prayers. However, some individual Jews use prayer beads, either out of familiarity (such as in the case of converts), or because they simply like to. So long as the beads have and will not be used in prayers for a contradictory religion, such as Christianity, and do not bear symbols of such a religion, they are understood as acceptable to use. These may be an existing strand of plain beads, such as mala beads, but one design specific to Judaism has 19 beads: 6 and 13, divided by a separator, to symbolize the 613 mitzvot.

=== Christianity ===
The Desert Fathers of the 3rd to 5th centuries, used pebbles or knotted ropes to count prayers, typically the Jesus Prayer ("Lord Jesus Christ, Son of God, have mercy on me, a sinner"). The invention is attributed to Saints Anthony the Great or his associate Pachomius the Great in the 4th century. In the Vita of Saint Paul of Thebes (227 AD to 342 AD), written by Saint Jerome (347 AD to 420 AD) it states that Saint Paul of Thebes used pebbles and knotted cord to count prayers.

Around the 8th century, Paternoster cords were used to count the 150 Psalms of the Bible, but for those who could not read, they were used to count 150 recitations of the Lord's Prayer. The Catholic Encyclopedia thus mentions strings of beads, presumably for prayer, found in the tombs of Saint Gertrude of Nivelles (7th century) and Saint Norbert and Saint Rosalia (12th century). A more explicit reference is that in 1125 William of Malmesbury mentioned a string of gems that Lady Godiva used to count prayers. The oldest prayer beads to be found in Britain were discovered by archaeologists on Lindisfarne in 2022: made of salmon vertebrae, they date from the 8th or 9th century.

Roman Catholics came to pray the Dominican rosary with strings of 59 beads. The term rosary comes from the Latin rosarium "rose garden" and is an important and traditional devotion of the Catholic Church, combining prayer and meditation in sequences (called "decades") of the Lord's Prayer, 10 Hail Marys, and a Gloria Patri as well as a number of other prayers (such as the Apostles' Creed and the Salve Regina) at the beginning and end. The prayers are accompanied by meditation on the Mysteries, events in the life and ministry of Jesus. This traditional Catholic form of the rosary is attributed to Saint Dominic, though some Catholic writers have doubted this claim. Catholic rosary beads are composed of crucifix and center medal which can be made of sterling silver and/or gold, and beads which are usually made of glass, amethyst, rose quartz stone, crystal, black onyx, lavender glass or pearl, but all parts can be made of any material. Catholics also use the standard Dominican rosary and prayer beads in other configurations to pray chaplets.

In Oriental Orthodox Christianity, especially among Ethiopian Christians and Coptic Christians, prayer beads known as the mequetaria/mequteria employ numbers such as 41, 64, and 100 as their length; the mequetaria is chiefly used for reciting Kyrie Eleison (Lord have mercy) during the seven fixed prayer times of Christianity. With regards to the first two numbers, the former represent the number of wounds inflicted on Jesus from scourging, the nails, and the lance while the latter represents Mary's age at her Assumption.

The Eastern Orthodox Church uses prayer ropes that usually come with 33, 50 or 100 knots. The loops of knotted wool (or occasionally of beads), called brojanica (Serbian, Macedonian), chotki (Russian) or komboskini (Greek) to pray the Jesus Prayer. Among Russian Old Believers, a prayer rope made of leather, called lestovka, is more common, although this type is no longer commonly used now by the Russian Orthodox Church. According to the Catholic Encyclopedia, "The rosary is conferred upon the Greek Orthodox monk as a part of his investiture with the mandyas or full monastic habit, as the second step in monastic life, and is called his 'spiritual sword'."

The Lutheran Wreath of Christ, invented by Martin Lönnebo, Bishop Emeritus of the Diocese of Linköping of the Swedish Lutheran Church, is a set of 18 beads, some round and some elongated, arranged in an irregular pattern. Each one has its own significance as a stimulus and reminder for meditation, although they can also be used for repetitive prayer.

In the mid-1980s, Anglican prayer beads were developed in the Protestant Episcopal Church in the United States, originating in the Diocese of Texas. The set consists of 33 beads (representing the 33 years of the life of Christ) arranged in four groupings of symbolic significance.

While there are liturgical churches using prayer beads in prayer, non-liturgical Christian churches do not use them.

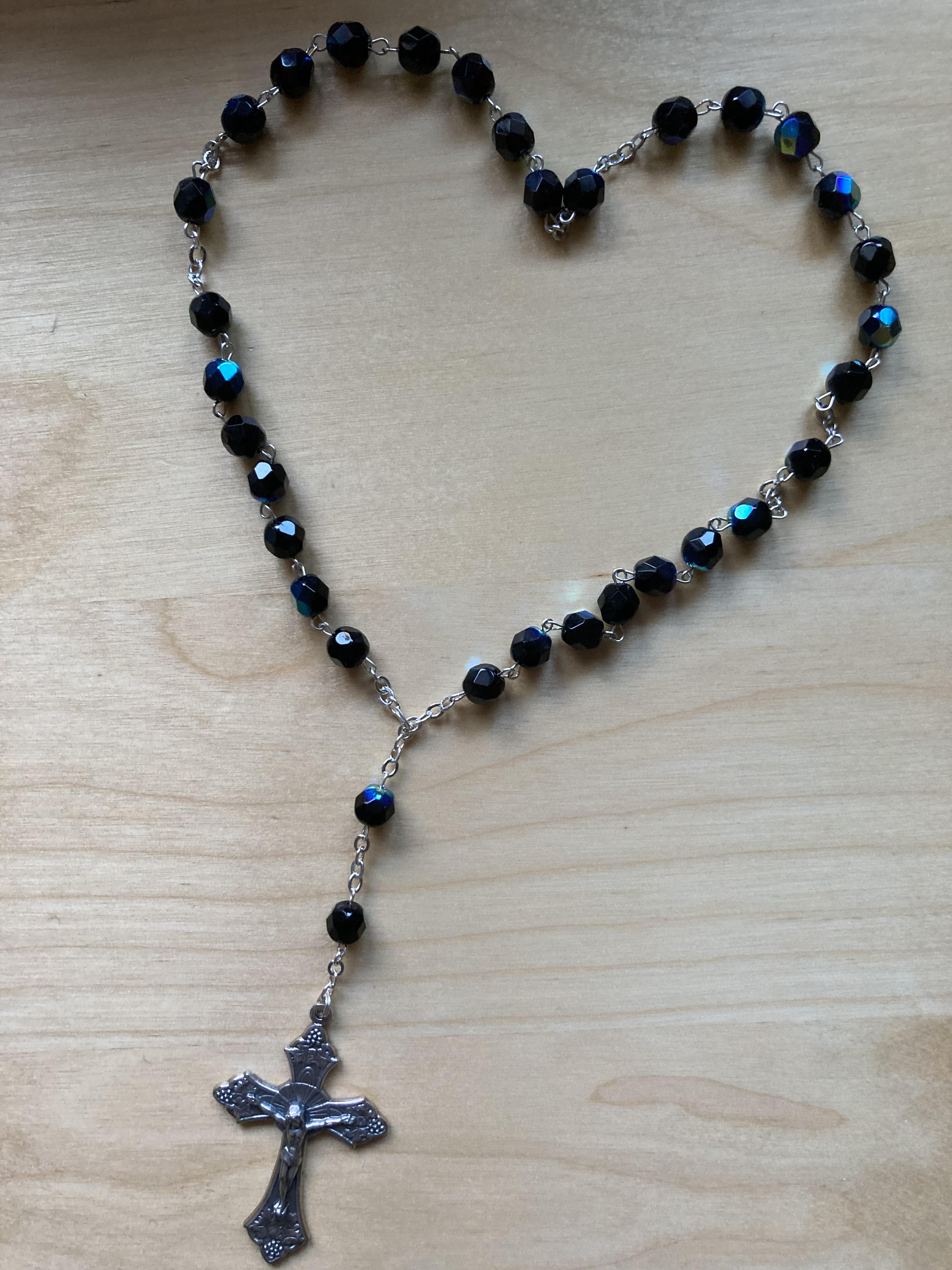
Anglican prayer beads

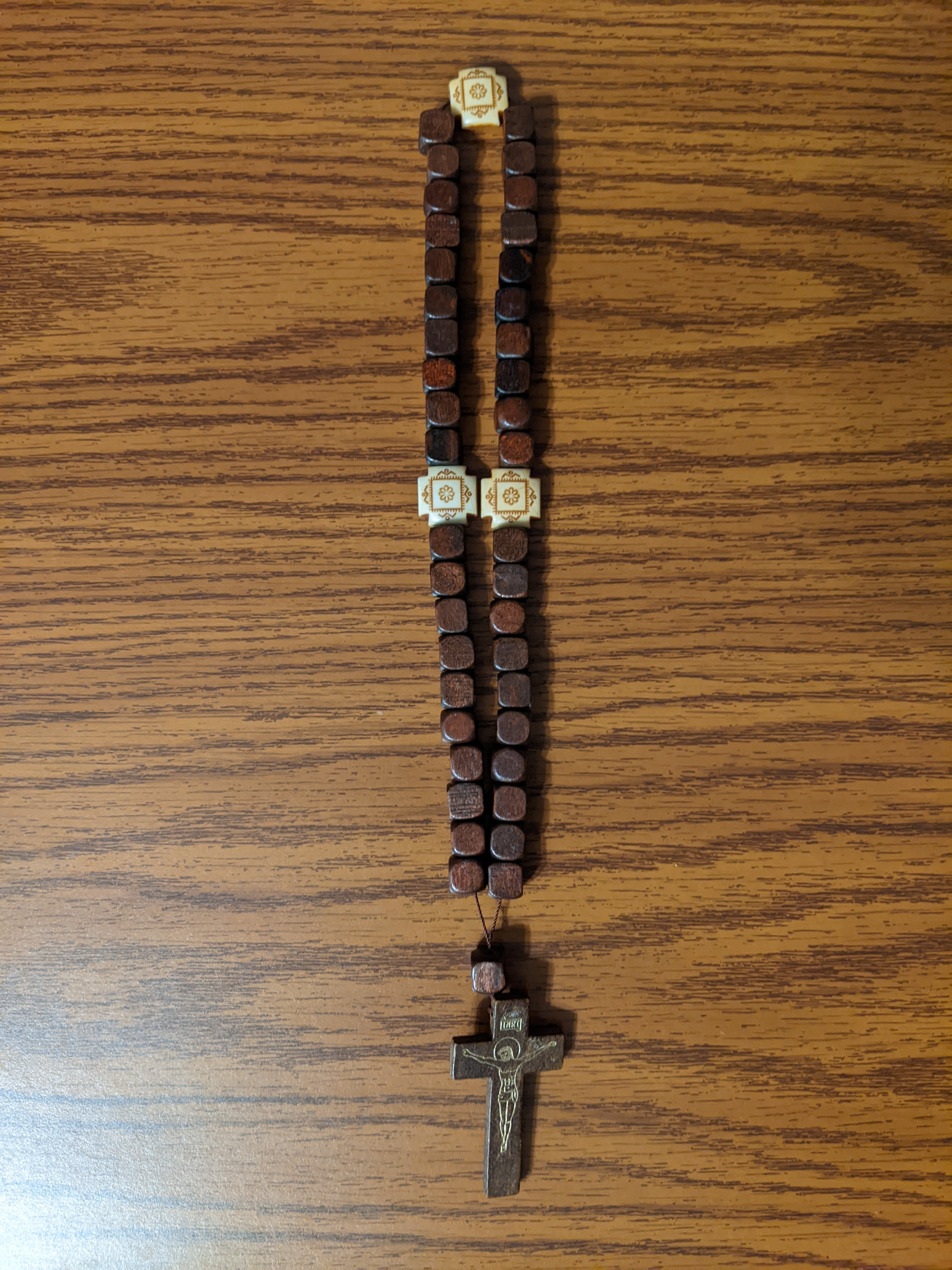
Oriental Orthodox mequteria of 41 beads

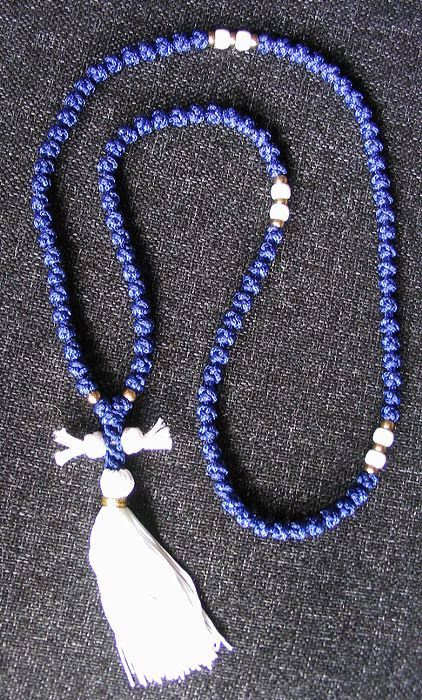
Greek Orthodox komboskini of 100 knots

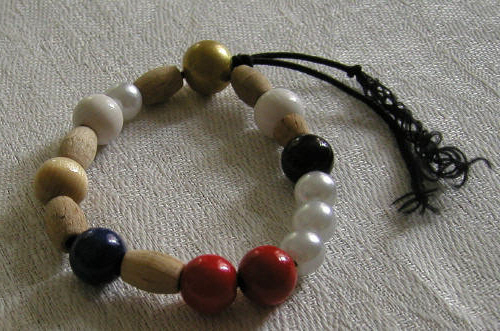
Lutheran Wreath of Christ

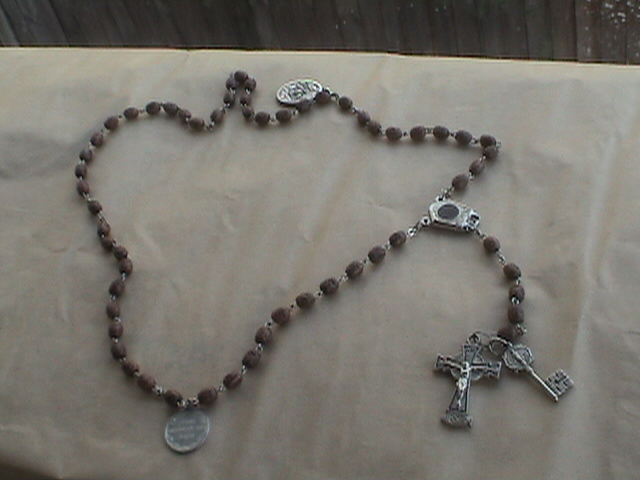
Hand-carved Roman Catholic rosary beads

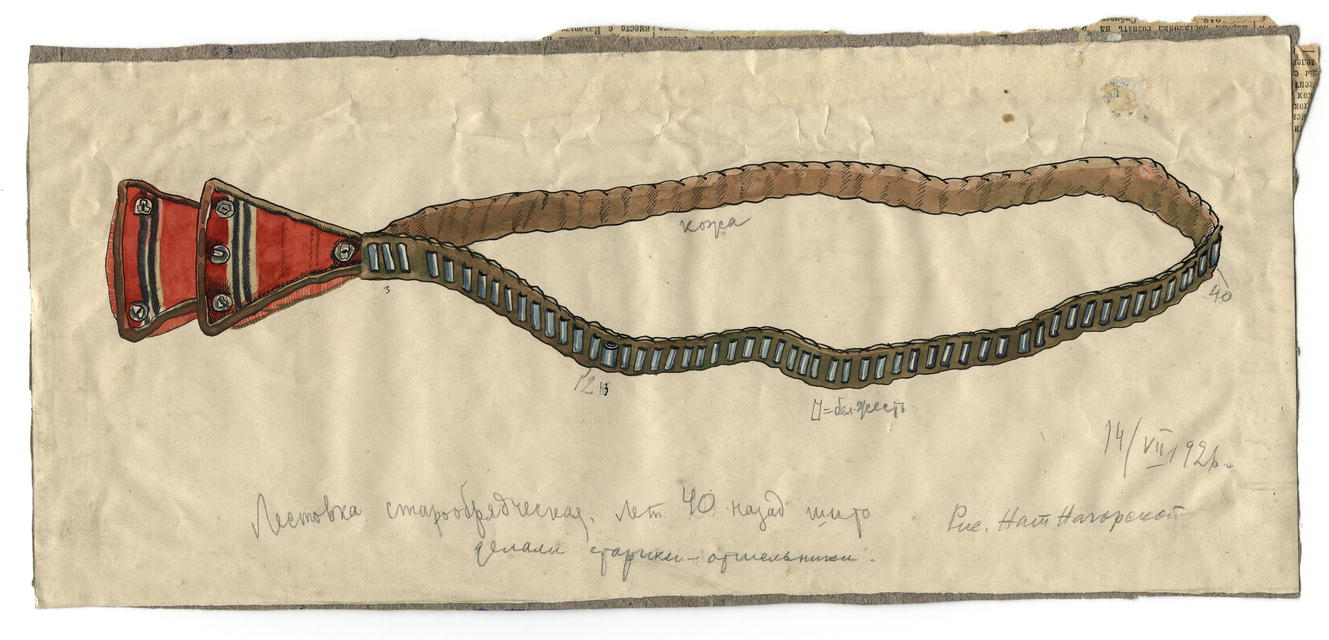
An Old Believer Russian Orthodox lestovka, made out of leather

=== Islam ===
In Islam, prayer beads are referred to as misbaha (Arabic: مِسْبَحَة, romanized: misbaḥah), subha, or as tasbih in reference to the prayers they are used with. They typically possess 99 regularly sized beads (corresponding to the names of God in Islam) with separators of two smaller beads, splitting the loop into three sections of 33 each. Sometimes, a misbaha of only 33 beads is used, in which case one would cycle through its beads three times. The tasbih prayer is a dhikr that involves the repetitive utterances of short sentences to praise and glorify God.

Most currents of mainstream Islam consider the use of the misbaha in prayer and recitations to be an accepted practice. According to some Salafis and members of the Ahmadiyya movement, the use of prayer beads is considered an innovation not practiced by early Muslims. However, Sunni scholar al-Suyuti mentions that early muslims like Abu Hurayra used a type of prayer beads. It is said that after Hamza ibn Abdul-Muttalib was killed in the Battle of Uhud, Muhammad's daughter Fāṭimah would visit his grave and then made a misbahah out of the soil on his grave.

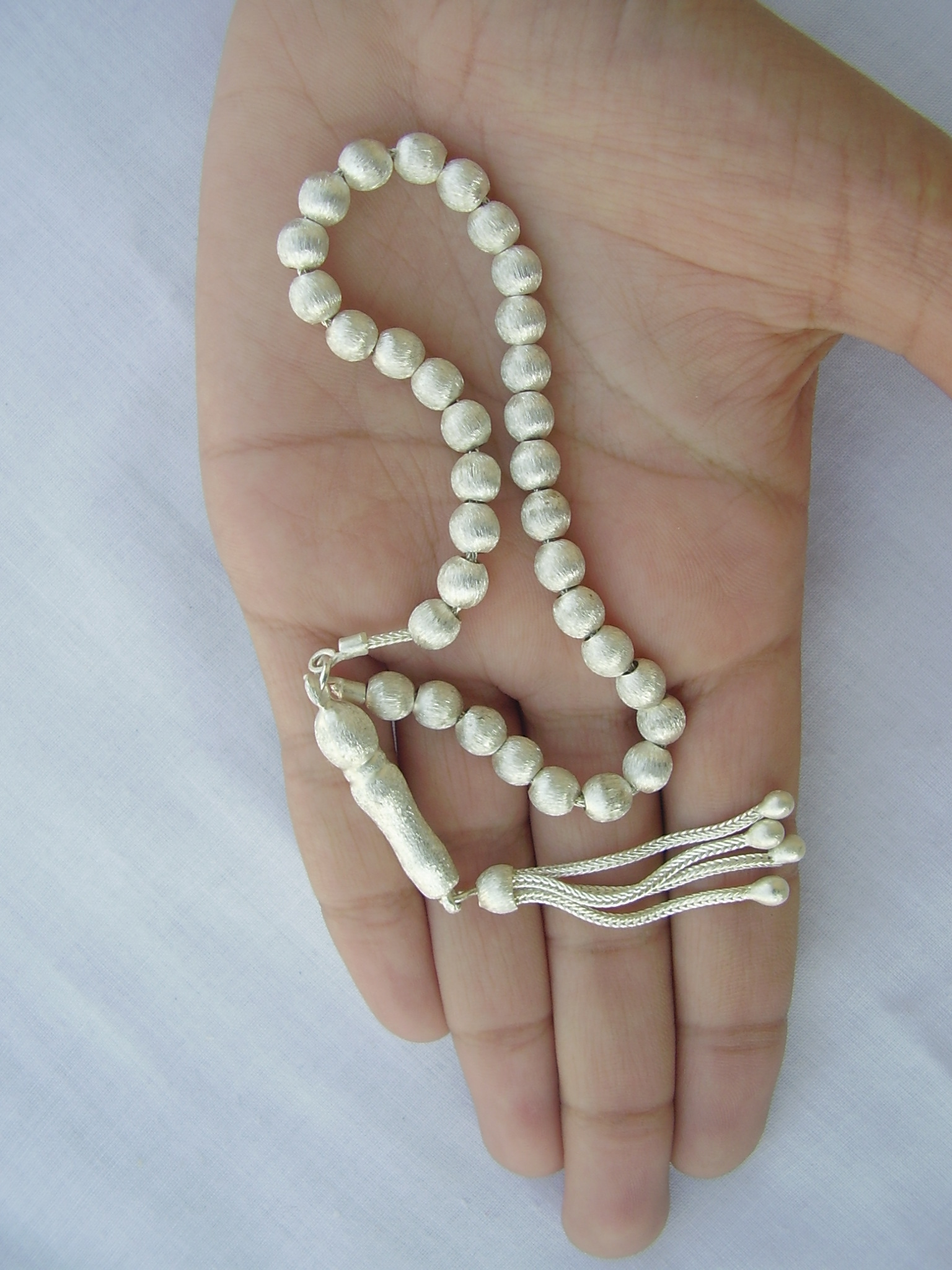
A silver misbaha

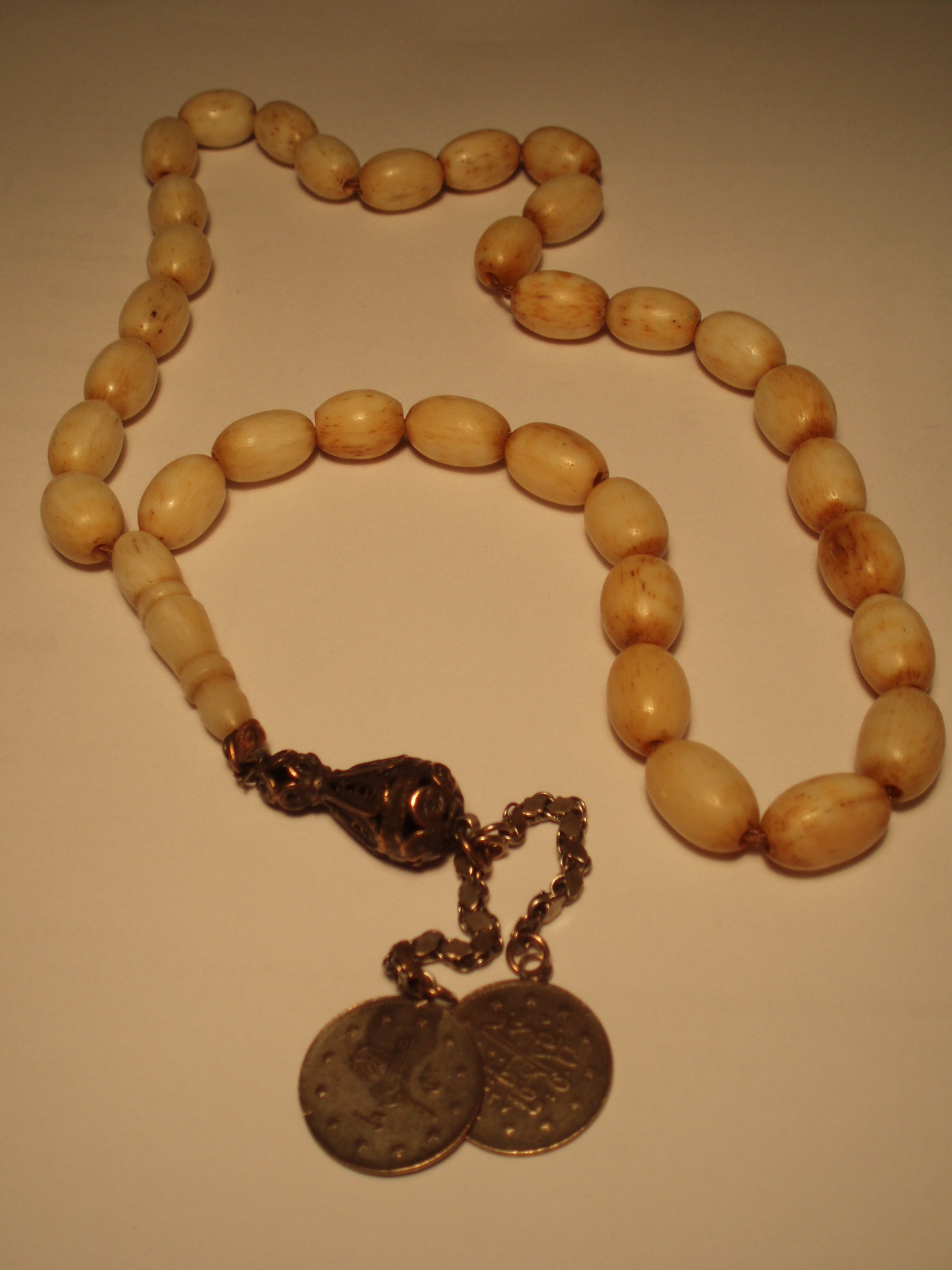
A misbaha

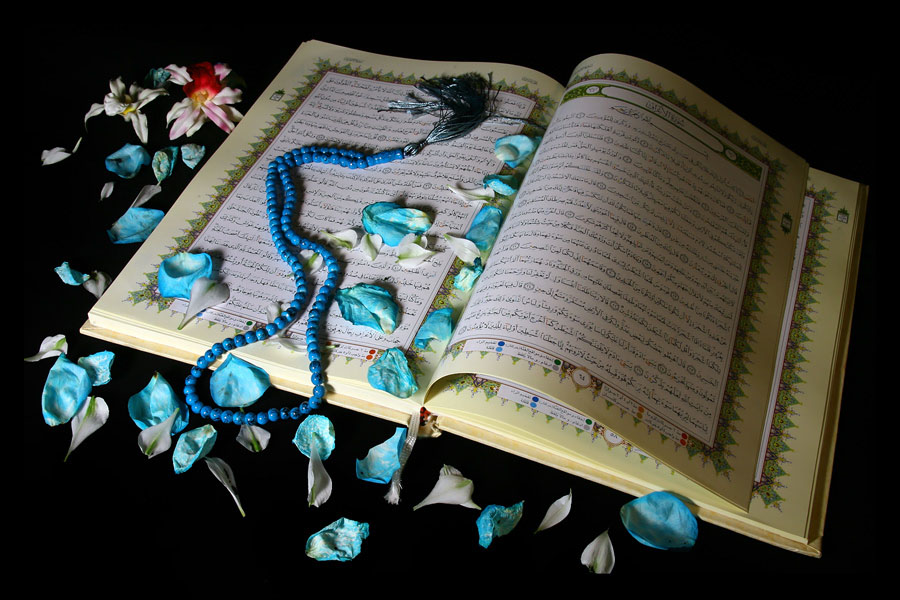
Quran and misbaha

=== Sikhism ===
Sikh worshipers may use mala (prayer beads) while reciting verses from the Guru Granth Sahib. These prayer beads are made from iron worn around the wrist; there are 27 such beads in a mala. This is also known as a simranee.

=== Hinduism ===
An early use of prayer beads can be traced to Hinduism where they are called japamala. Japa is the repeating of the name of a deity or a mantra. Mala (Sanskrit: माला mālā) means "garland" or "wreath".

Japamala are used for repetition of pure essence of mantras and scriptures, for other forms of sādhanā or "holistic spiritual exercise" and as an aid to meditation, yoga, to experience self-realization, harmony, peace, stability, and positivity in life. The most common mala have 108 beads. The most common materials used for making the beads are Rudraksha seeds (used by Shaivites) and Ocimum tenuiflorum (tulasi) stems (used by Vaishnavites). Other materials such as metals, seeds of a lotus and pearls are also used to make the beads.

While using the prayer beads, one bead is moved at a time until arriving to the terminal bead. Once the terminal bead is touched, the prayer beads are reversed and counted in the opposite direction. It is held in a particular manner using the middle finger and thumb only, deliberately avoiding the use of the index finger – considering it to be inauspicious. The user also covers the prayer beads with a cloth called bag called "gomukha."

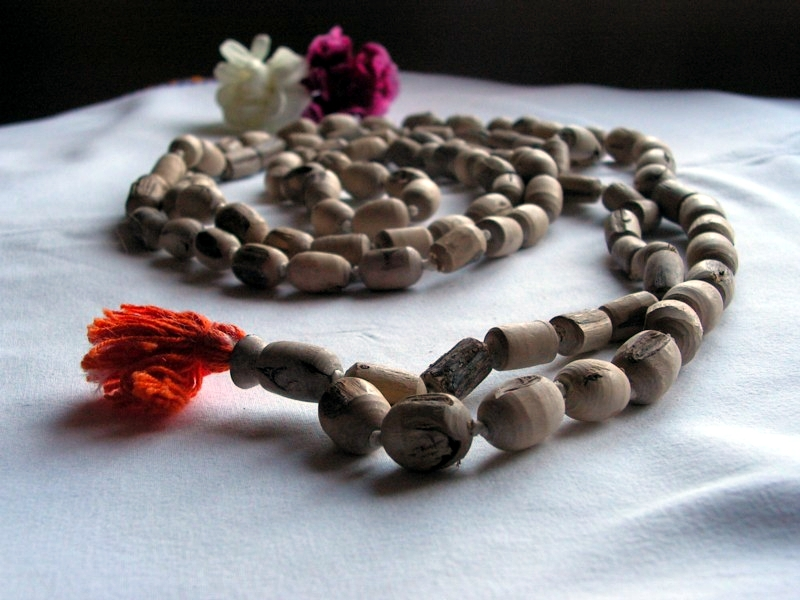
Hindu Japa mala prayer beads, made from Tulasi wood, with the head bead in the foreground.

=== Buddhism ===
Prayer beads (Chinese: 佛珠; 念珠; pinyin: fózhū, niànzhū, Japanese: 数珠, romanized: juzu, zuzu, Korean: 염주 (yeomju), Standard Tibetan: ཕྲེང་བ།, romanized: phreng ba) are also used in many forms of Mahayana Buddhism, often with a lesser number of beads (usually a divisor of 108). In Pure Land Buddhism, for instance, 27-bead malas are common. These shorter malas are sometimes called "prostration rosaries" because they are easier to hold when enumerating repeated prostrations. In Tibetan Buddhism malas are also 108 beads: one mala counts as 100 mantras, and the eight extra are meant to be dedicated to all sentient beings (the practice as a whole is dedicated at its end as well). In Tibetan Buddhism, often larger malas are used; for example, malas of 111 beads. When counting, they calculate one mala as 100 mantras and the 11 additional beads are taken as extra to compensate for errors.

Various type of materials are used to make mala beads such as seeds of the rudraksha, beads made from the wood of the tulsi plant, animal bone, wood or seeds from the Bodhi Tree (a particularly sacred tree of the species Ficus religiosa) or of Nelumbo nucifera (the lotus plant). Semi-precious stones like carnelian and amethyst are also used. Another commonly used material is sandalwood.

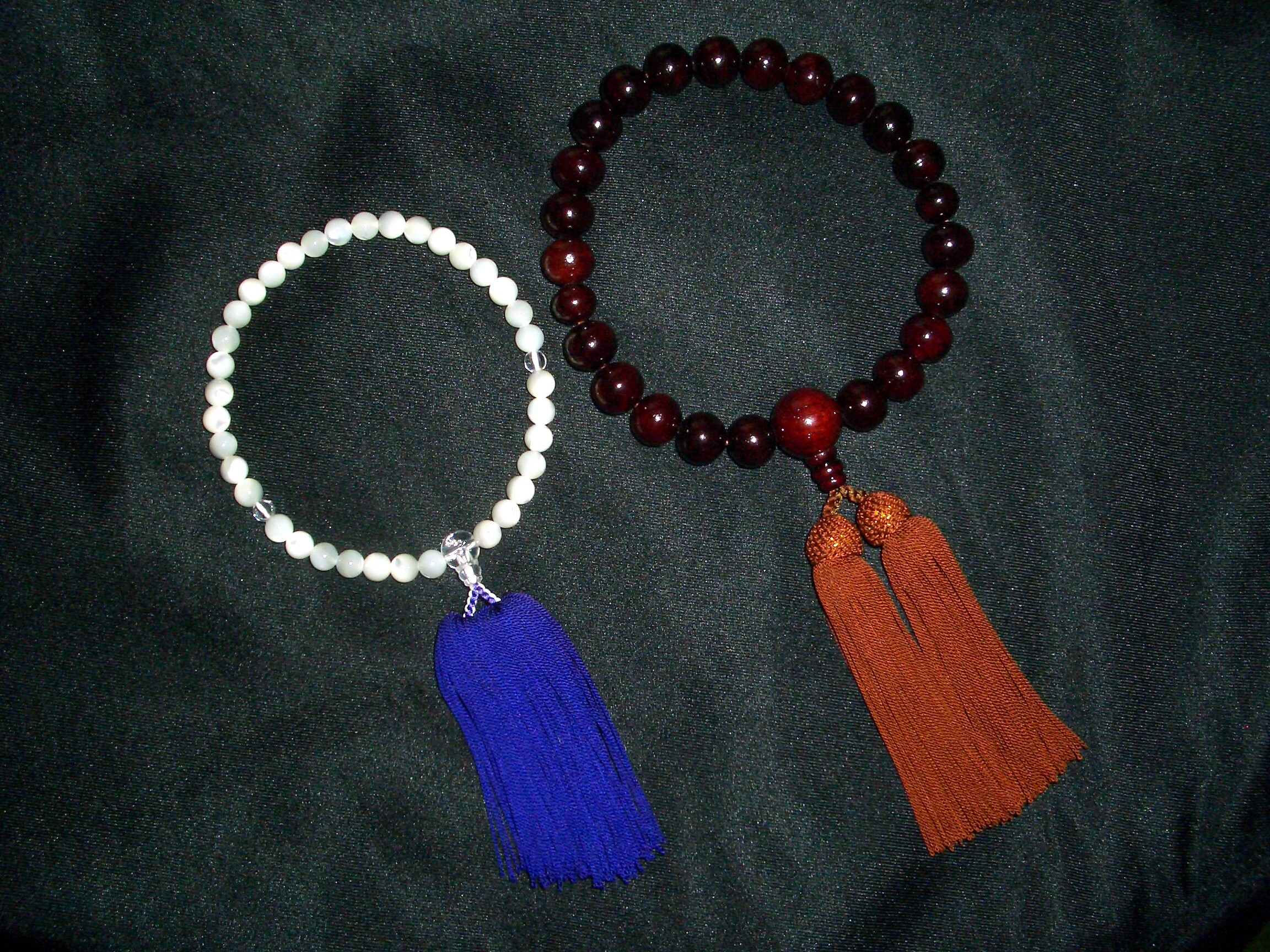
Japanese Zen Buddhist prayer beads (Juzu)

Antique Chinese Buddhist Qinan prayer beads (Niànzhū), Qing Dynasty, 19th century, China; Adilnor Collection, Sweden

=== Bahá’í Faith ===
The Baháʼí Faith stipulates that the verse Alláh-u-Abhá "God the All-Glorious" be recited 95 times daily after the performance of ablutions. To help facilitate this recitation Bahá’ís often use prayer beads, though they are not required to. Most commonly, Bahá’í prayer beads consist of 95 individual beads on a strand or a strand of 19 beads with 5 set counters. In the latter case, the person reciting the verses typically tracks the 19 individual verses in a set with one hand and tracks the sets of verses with the other (19 verses times 5 sets for a total of 95 total verses). Bahá’í prayer beads are made of any number of natural and man-made materials including glass, precious and semi-precious stones, various metals and wood. There are no traditions regarding the structure of the prayer bead strand or the materials used.

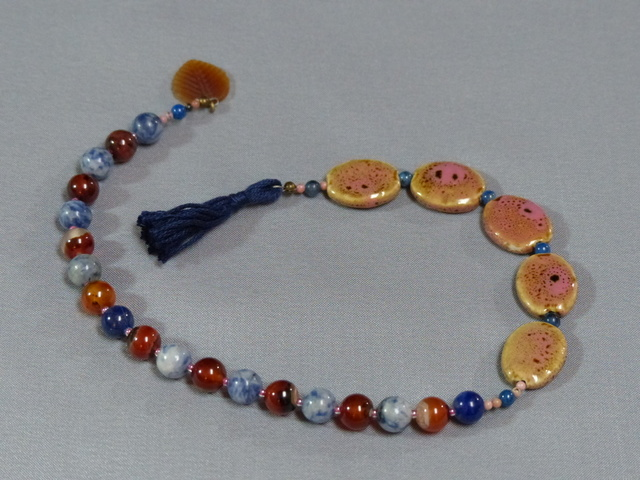
Baháʼí prayer beads in a 19 bead, 5 set counter configuration

== Materials used for making prayer beads ==
=== Seeds and fruitstones ===
- Abrus precatorius
- Afzelia species
- Choerospondias axillaris
- Dracontomelon dao
- Rudraksha
- Vyjanti

=== Gems and precious stones ===
- Pearls
- Rose Quartz
- Amethyst
- Lava stone
- Onyx
- Amber

=== Other materials ===
- Petals of the rose flower

== See also ==
- Prayer rope
- Worry beads

== Bibliography ==
- Dubin, L.S. (2009). Prayer Beads. In C. Kenney (Ed.), The History of Beads: From 100,000 B.C. to the Present (Revised and Expanded Edition) (pp. 79–92). New York: Abrams Publishing.
- Henry, G., & Marriott, S. (2008). Beads of Faith: Pathways to Meditation and Spirituality Using Rosaries, Prayer Beads and Sacred Words. Fons Vitae Publishing.
- Untracht, O. (2008). Rosaries of India. In H. Whelchel (Ed.), Traditional Jewelry of India (pp. 69–73). New York: Thames & Hudson, Inc.
- Wiley, E., & Shannon, M.O. (2002). A String and a Prayer: How to Make and Use Prayer Beads. Red Wheel/Weiser, LLC.
- Winston, K. (2008). Bead One, Pray Too: A Guide to Making and Using Prayer Beads. Morehouse Publishing.
