= Anglican prayer beads =

Christian devotional prayer beads

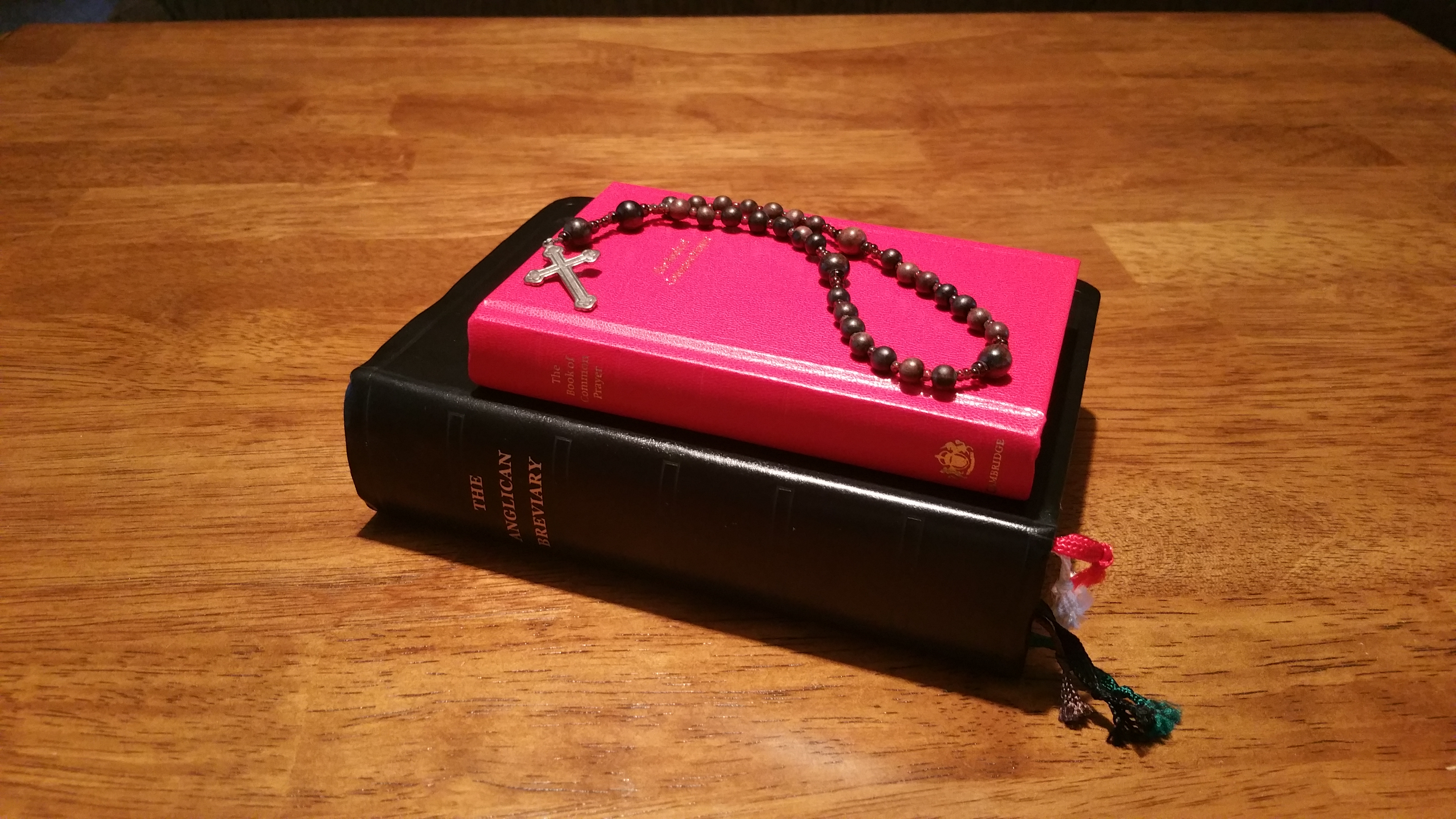
An Anglican rosary with simple cross sitting atop the Anglican Breviary and the Book of Common Prayer

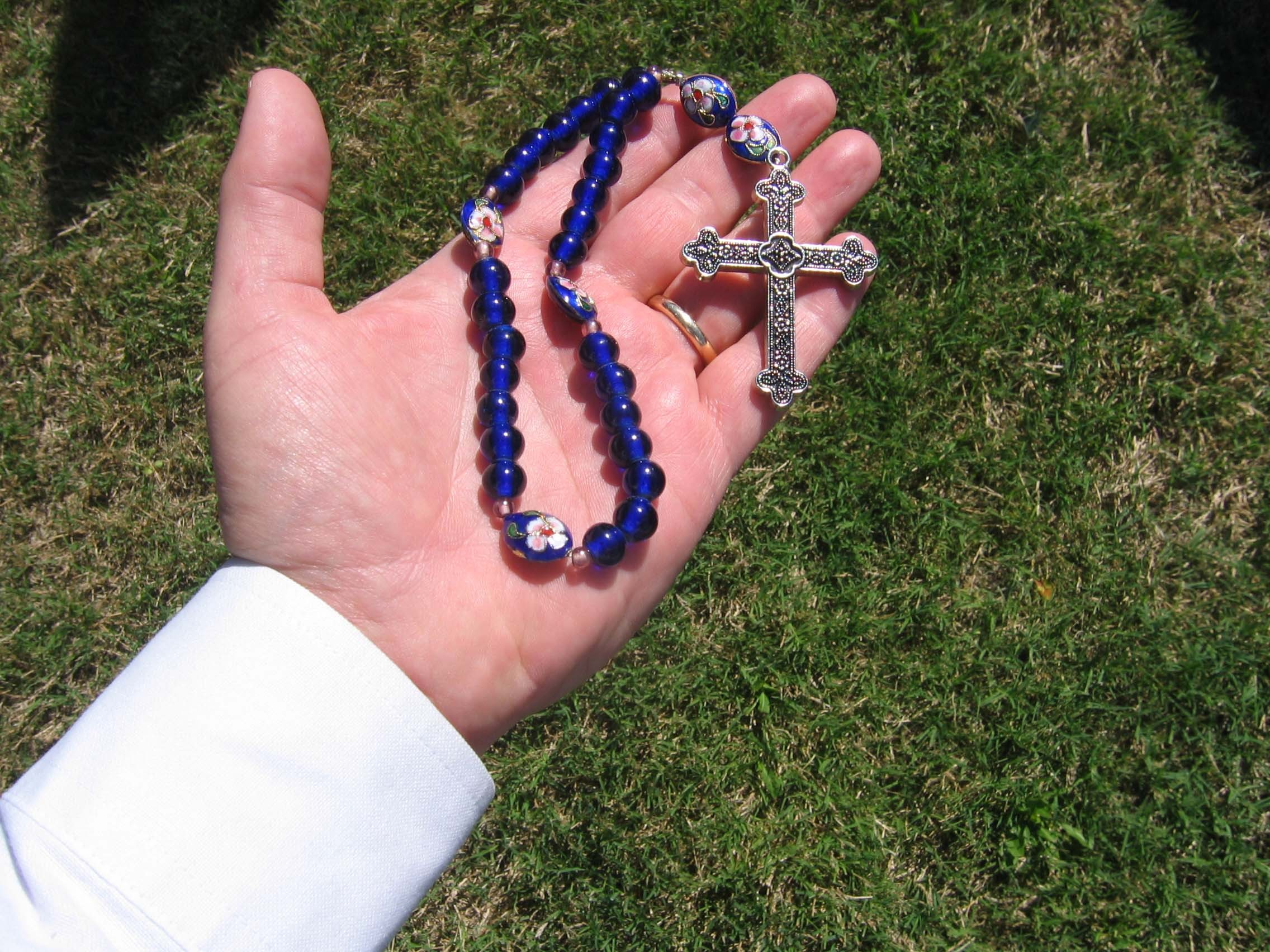
An Anglican rosary, comprising 33 beads and a cross

Anglican prayer beads, also known as the Anglican rosary or Anglican chaplet, are a loop of strung Christian prayer beads used chiefly by Anglicans in the Anglican Communion, as well as by communicants in the Anglican Continuum. This Anglican devotion has spread to other Christian denominations, including Methodists and the Reformed.

== Description ==
Anglican prayer bead sets consist of a cross and thirty-three beads.

=== Beads ===
The loop is formed of 32 beads. 28 of the beads are divided into four groups consisting of seven beads, each which are called "weeks". The four larger beads separating the four groups are called "cruciform" beads. When the loop of an Anglican prayer bead set is opened into a circular shape, the "cruciform" beads form the points of a cross within the circle of the set, hence the term. Next after the cross on Anglican prayer bead sets is a single bead called the "invitatory" bead, which brings the total of beads to 33, symbolizing the 33 years of Jesus' earthly life.

==== Materials ====
The beads used can be made of a variety of materials, such as precious stones, wood, coloured glass, or even dried and painted seeds.

==== Symbolism ====
The number 33 signifies the number of years that Jesus Christ lived on the Earth, while the number seven signifies wholeness or completion in the faith, the days of creation, and the seasons of the Church year.

=== Cross ===
Anglican prayer bead sets are made with a variety of crosses or, occasionally, crucifixes, such as the Celtic cross and the San Damiano cross.

== Prayer ==
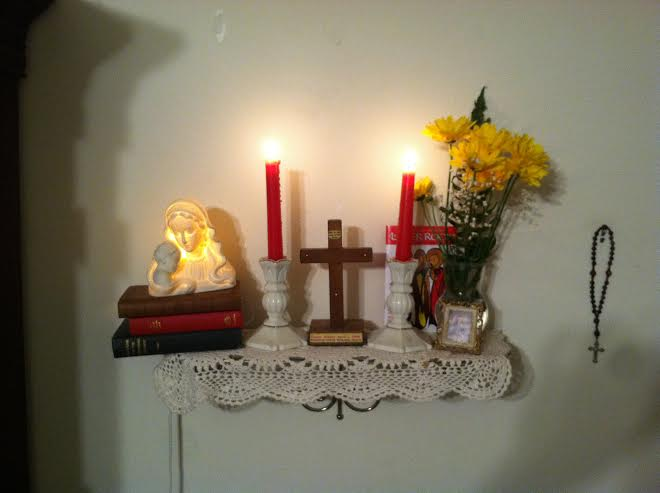
The Anglican Rosary hangs next to a Methodist home altar.

Anglican prayer beads are most often used as a tactile aid to prayer and as a counting device. The standard Anglican set consists of the following pattern, starting with the cross, followed by the Invitatory Bead, and subsequently, the first Cruciform bead, moving to the right, through the first set of seven beads to the next Cruciform bead, continuing around the circle. They may conclude by saying the Lord's Prayer on the invitatory bead or a final prayer on the cross as in the examples below. The entire circle may be done thrice, which signifies the three years of Jesus' public ministry and the Holy Trinity.

The Cross

In the Name of God, Father, Son, and Holy Spirit. Amen.

The Invitatory
O God make speed to save me (us),
O Lord make haste to help me (us),
Glory to the Father, and to the Son, and to the Holy Spirit: As it was in the beginning, is now, and will be forever. Amen.

The Cruciforms
Holy God,
Holy Almighty,
Holy Immortal One,
Have mercy upon me (us).

The Weeks
Lord Jesus Christ, Son of God,
Have mercy on me, a sinner.

The Lord's Prayer
Our Father, who art in heaven,
hallowed be thy Name,
thy kingdom come, thy will be done,
on earth as it is in heaven.
Give us this day our daily bread.
And forgive us our trespasses,
as we forgive those who trespass against us.
And lead us not into temptation,
but deliver us from evil.
For thine is the kingdom,
and the power, and the glory,
forever and ever. Amen.

The Cross
I bless the Lord.
(Let us bless the Lord

Thanks be to God.)

== See also ==
- Rosary
- Prayer rope
- Quiet time
- Wreath of Christ

== Bibliography ==
- Duckworth, Penelope (2004). Mary: The Imagination of Her Heart. Cambridge, Massachusetts: Cowley Publications. ISBN 978-1-56101-260-2.
- Schultz, Thomas (2003). The Rosary for Episcopalians/Anglicans (2nd ed.). Oakland, California: Regent Press. ISBN 978-1-58790-055-6.
