= Aisha Gray Henry =

American Islamic scholar

Aisha Gray Henry, also known as Virginia Gray Henry Blakemore, is an American writer, Islamic scholar, filmmaker and editor.

== Biography ==
Gray Henry earned her B.A. in art history and world religions from Sarah Lawrence College and her M.A in education from the University of Michigan. She also studied for ten years at Al-Azhar. In 1981, she helped to establish the Islamic Texts Society in Cambridge.

Gray Henry is the founder and director of Fons Vitae Publishing. Gray Henry and Fons Vitae have worked on making the works of al-Ghazali accessible to children. In 2006, Gray Henry arranged for an interfaith meeting between the Dalai Lama and Muslim scholars.

Gray Henry is an art historian and scholar of religion who taught at the Dalton School, Fordham and Cambridge Universities. Gray Henry is a co-founder and board member of the Thomas Merton Center Foundation where she arranges meetings on the works of Thomas Merton.

== Filmography ==
- Beads of Faith: Pathways to Meditation and Spirituality Using Rosaries, Prayer Beads and Sacred Words available as a book and film.
- Islam: A Pictorial Essay
- Cairo: 1001 Years of Art and Architecture
- Death and Transformation: The Personal Reflections of Huston Smith
- The Ornaments of Lhasa: Islam in Tibet
