= Fons Vitae Publishing =

American publishing company

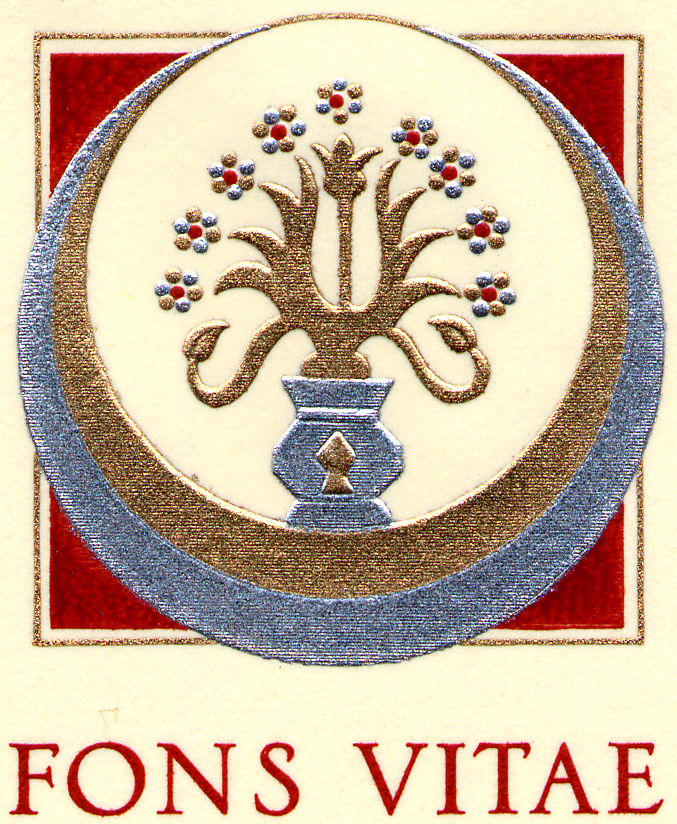
- Founded: 1996
- Founder: Aisha Gray Henry
- Country of origin: United States
- Headquarters location: Louisville, Kentucky
- Nonfiction topics: Islam, Sufism, religion, interfaith, philosophy, spirituality
- Official website: fonsvitae.com

Fons Vitae is a non-profit 501(c)(3), peer-reviewed independent publishing house based in Louisville, Kentucky. It publishes interfaith scholarly works focused primarily on world spirituality. Fons Vitae has been recognised for its English translations of major Arabic and Persian works, especially in the field of Islamic Studies and Sufism. In addition to their publications, Fons Vitae organises lecture series and events related to world religions, and is involved in prison outreach and school programmes. With a global readership, both academic and general (including children's titles), Fons Vitae bridges cultural and intellectual discourses through carefully curated academic and spiritual texts. The current catalogue contains more than 300 titles.

Among Fons Vitae's series of publications are the Ghazali Translation Series, Sufi Master Rumi Series, Ibn 'Arabi Series, Imam al-Haddad Series, Ibn 'Ajiba Series, Quranic Commentary Series, the Thomas Merton Series, and the Ghazali Children's Project.

== Name ==
Fons Vitae is Latin for “the Fountain of Life”, which refers to the Divine Source from which Wisdom and Truth emanate. It relates to the Abrahamic imagery of the Rivers of Paradise.

== History ==
Fons Vitae was founded in 1984 by Aisha Gray Henry, “a seventh-generation Kentuckian” scholar, graduate of Sarah Lawrence College and Al-Azhar University.

From its foundation, Fons Vitae has collaborated with prominent religion scholars like Hamza Yusuf, Martin Lings, Seyyed Hossein Nasr, Timothy Winter, and William Chittick.
