= Prayer rope =

Item used in Christianity to assist prayer

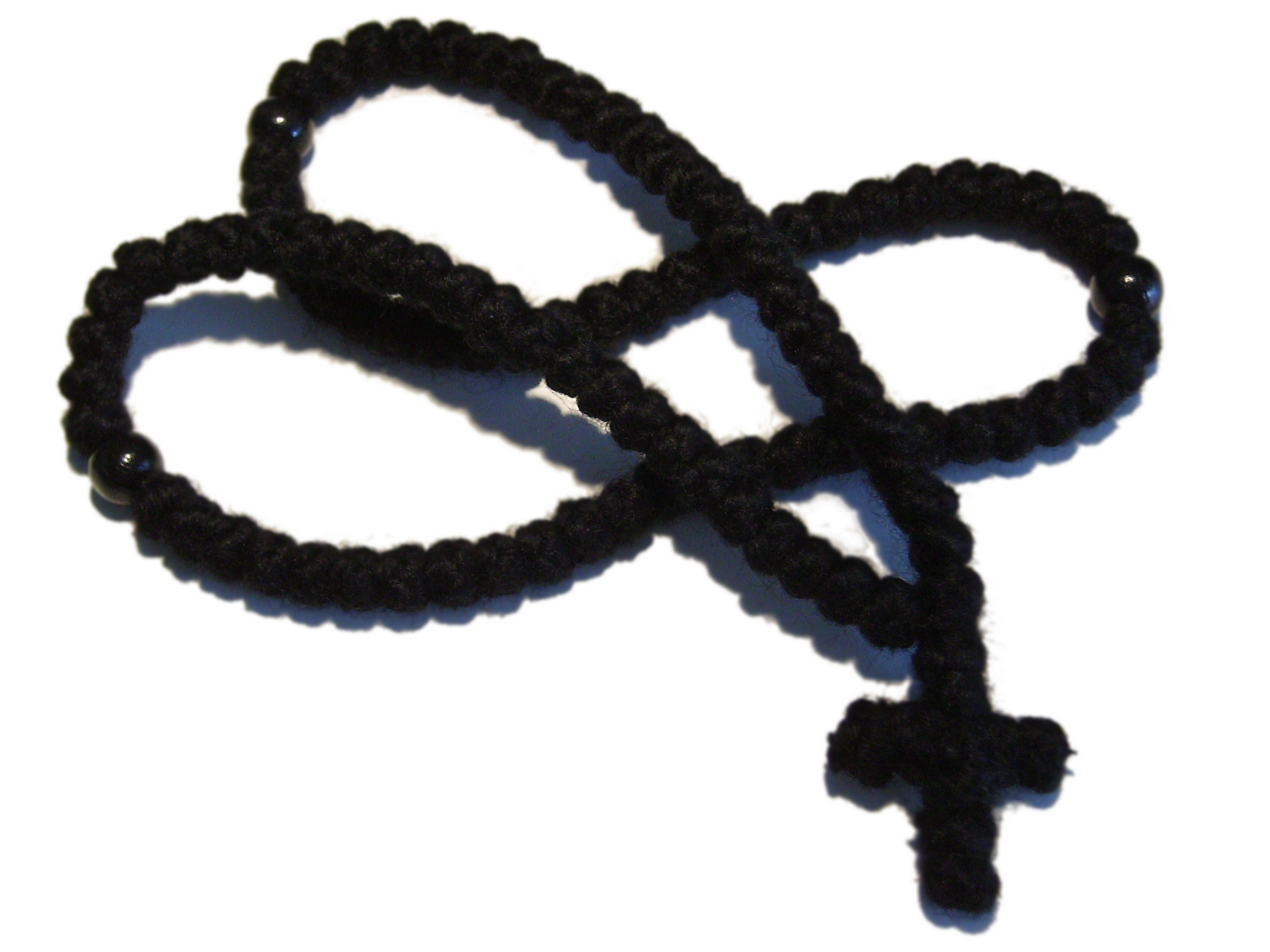
Simple black Eastern Christian prayer rope without tassel

A prayer rope (Note: Greek: κομποσκοίνι, romanized: komboskíni; Russian: чётки, romanized: chyotki or вервица, vervitsa (literal translation); Arabic: مسبحة, romanized: misbaḥa; Romanian: metanii or metanier; Serbian and Macedonian: бројаница, romanized: brojanica; Bulgarian: броеница, romanized: broenitsa; Georgian: სკვნილი, romanized: skvnili; Coptic: ⲙⲉⲕⲩⲧⲁⲣⲓⲁ, romanized: mequ(e)taria; Ge'ez: መቁጠሪያ, romanized: mequteria, or መቍጠርያ, mequeteria.) is a loop made up of complex woven knots formed in a cross pattern, usually out of wool or silk. The typical prayer rope has thirty-three knots, representing the thirty-three years of Christ's life. It is employed by monastics, and sometimes by others, to count the number of times one has prayed the Jesus Prayer (or occasionally other prayers).

Prayer ropes are part of the practice of Eastern Christian monks and nuns, particularly within Eastern Orthodoxy, Eastern Catholicism, and Oriental Orthodoxy. Among the Coptic, Ethiopian, and Eritrean Orthodox Churches, a prayer rope is known by its Coptic or Ge'ez name (mequetaria).

== Description ==
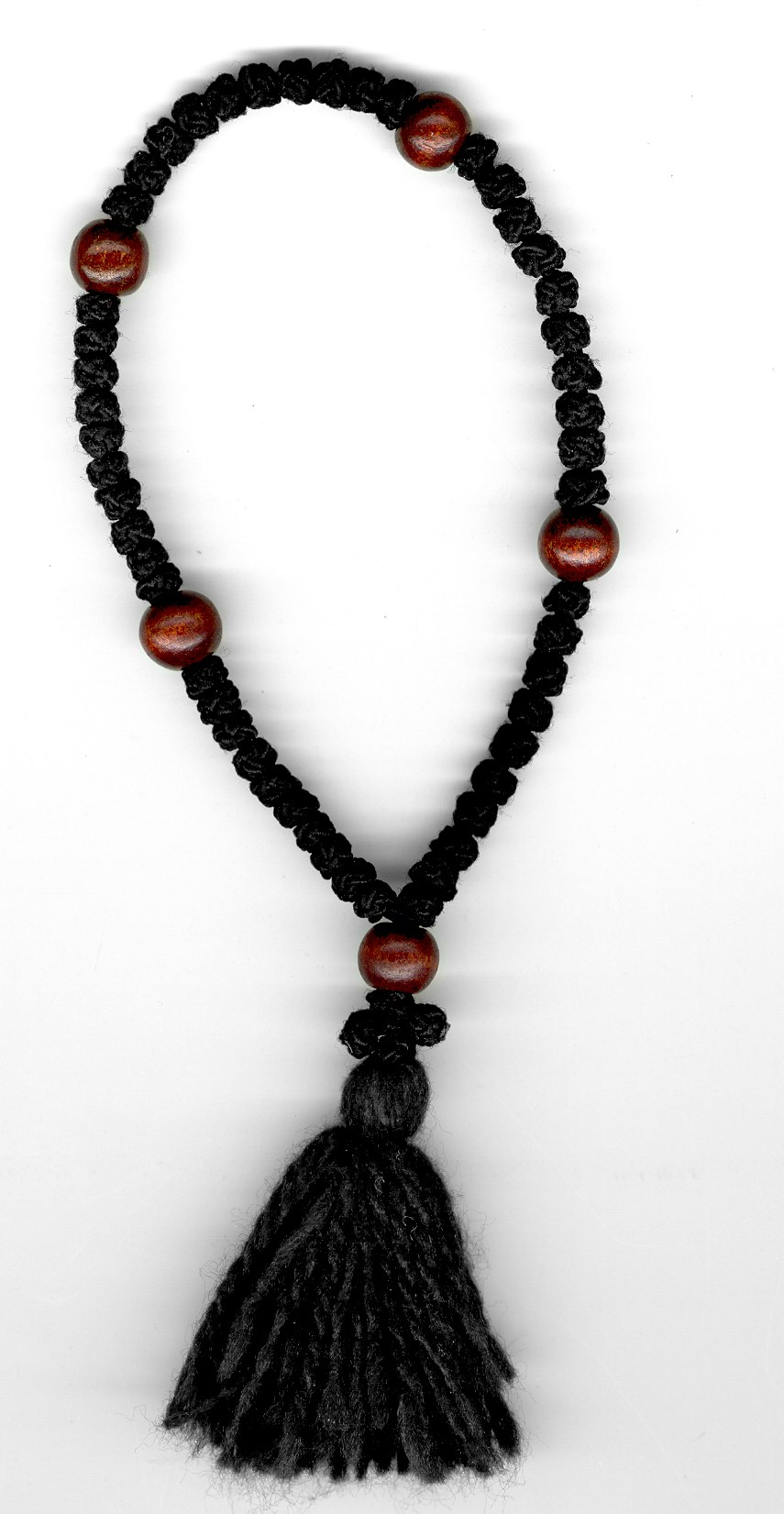
Eastern Christian prayer rope with 50 knots and 5 wooden beads

Historically, the prayer rope would typically have 100 knots, although prayer ropes with 150, 60, 50, 33, 64 or 41 knots can also be found in use today. There are even small 10-knot prayer ropes intended to be worn on the finger. Hermits in their cells may have prayer ropes with as many as 300 or 500 knots in them.

Characteristically, the knots of a prayer rope are diamond knots (ABoK #787).

There is typically a knotted cross where the prayer rope is joined together to form a loop, and a few beads at certain intervals between the knots (usually every 10 or 25 knots) for ease in counting. Longer prayer ropes frequently have a tassel at the end of the cross; its purpose is to dry the tears shed due to heartfelt compunction for one's sins. The tassel can also be said to represent the glory of the Heavenly Kingdom, which one can enter only through the Cross. Additionally, the tassel represents an inherited tradition of prayer. The symbol of tassels as tradition coming from Old Testament commandments to Jews to wear tassels on their garments to keep in mind the received laws.

The prayer rope is commonly made out of wool, symbolizing the flock of Christ; though in modern times other materials are used also. The traditional color of the rope is black (symbolizing mourning for one's sins), with either black or colored beads. The beads (if they are colored) and at least a portion of the tassel are traditionally red, symbolizing the blood of Christ and the blood of the martyrs. In recent times, however, prayer ropes have been made in a wide variety of colors.

Among the Oriental Orthodox, the prayer rope is composed of 41, 64, or 100 beads and is primarily used to recite the Kyrie Eleison (Lord, have mercy) prayer as well as others such as the Lord's Prayer and the Magnificat. In regard to the first two numbers, the first number represents the number of lashes inflicted on Jesus (39 according to Jewish custom) alongside the lance wound and crown of thorns, while the latter represents Mary's age upon her Assumption respectively.

== Use ==
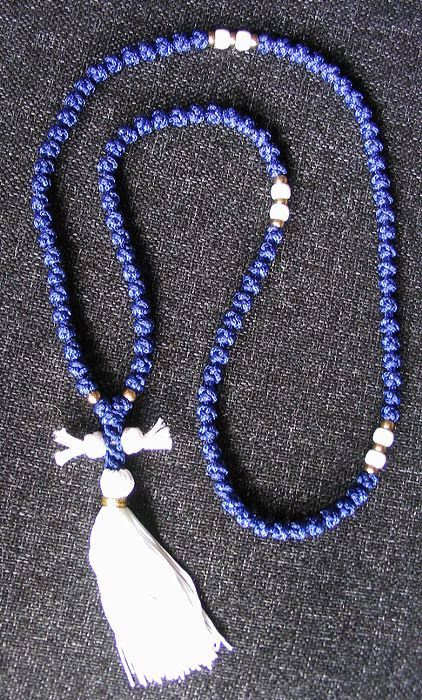
Greek komboskini of 100 knots

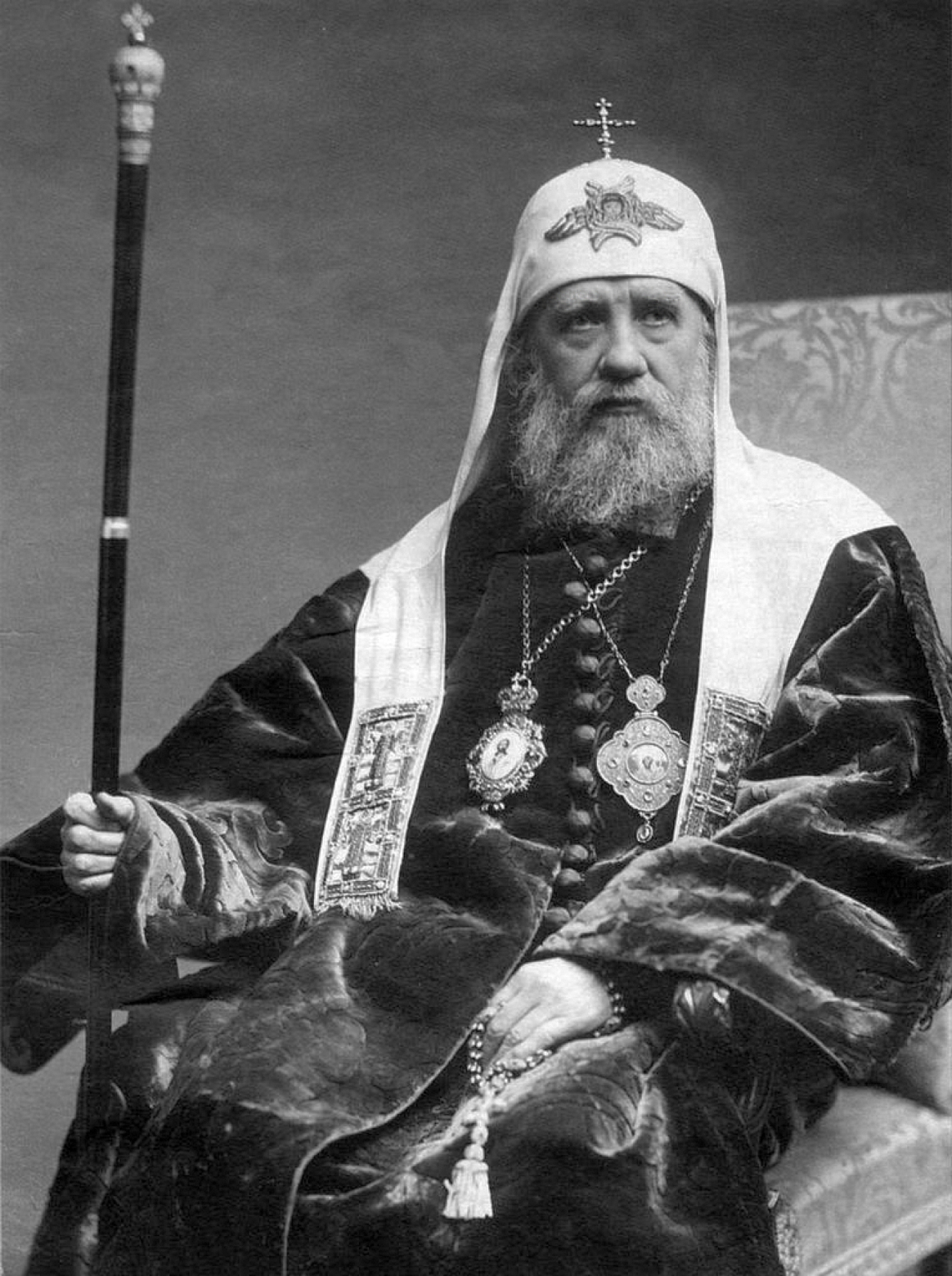
Tikhon of Moscow dressed in his monastic habit as the Patriarch of Moscow and All Russia with a white prayer rope in his left hand

When praying, the user normally holds the prayer rope in the left hand, leaving the right hand free to make the Sign of the Cross. When not in use, the prayer rope is traditionally wrapped around the left wrist so that it continues to remind one to pray without ceasing. If this is impractical, it may be placed in the (left) pocket, but should not be hung around the neck or suspended from the belt. The reason for this is humility: one should not be ostentatious or conspicuous in displaying the prayer rope for others to see.

During their tonsure (religious profession), Eastern Orthodox monks and nuns receive a prayer rope, with the words:

Accept, O brother (sister) (name), the sword of the Spirit which is the word of God (Ephesians 6:17) in the everlasting Jesus prayer by which you should have the name of the Lord in your soul, your thoughts, and your heart, saying always: "Lord Jesus Christ, Son of God, have mercy on me a sinner."

Orthodoxy regards the prayer rope as the sword of the Spirit, because prayer which is heartfelt and inspired by the grace of the Holy Spirit is a weapon that defeats the Devil.

Among some Orthodox monastics (and occasionally other faithful), the canonical hours and preparation for Holy Communion may be replaced by praying the Jesus Prayer a specified number of times dependent on the service being replaced. In this way prayers can still be said even if the service books are for some reason unavailable or the person is not literate or otherwise unable to recite the service; the prayer rope becomes a very practical tool in such cases, simply for keeping count of the prayers said. However, among some monastics, e.g. hesychasts, this replacement is the norm.

One scheme for replacing the Divine Services with the Jesus Prayer and prostrations is as follows:

Instead of the entire Psalter: 6,000 Jesus Prayers and prostrations

One kathisma of the Psalter: 300 prayers and prostrations (100 for each stasis)

Midnight Office: 600
Matins: 1,500
The Hours without the Inter-Hours: 1000;
The Hours with the Inter-Hours: 1,500
Vespers: 600
Great Compline: 700
Small Compline: 400
A Canon or Akathist to the Most Holy Theotokos (Mother of God): 500

Over the centuries, various cell rules have developed to help the individual in the daily use of the prayer rope. However, there is no single, standardized method in use universally throughout the Church. There may be prostrations after each prayer or after a certain number of prayers, depending upon the particular rule being followed.

Not only is the Jesus Prayer used, but Eastern Christians also have many "breath prayers". Contrary to thought, they are not to be said using spiritual breathing, as that can only be determined by a spiritual father. Breath prayers continuously repeated on the prayer rope may include: Lord Have Mercy, Come Lord Jesus, Lord I Believe...Help My Unbelief, Lord Save Me, etc.

== Wearing ==
Among Orthodox believers, small 33-knot prayer ropes are frequently worn around the wrist. Some Orthodox Christians may be seen wearing a large 100-knot prayer rope around their neck. However, this is considered incorrect by the vast majority of Orthodox churches, since the prayer rope is meant to be used for prayer only; the rope is to always be worn around the left wrist (sometimes also woven between fingers) when not in use.

== History ==
The history of the prayer rope goes back to the origins of Christian monasticism itself. The invention of the prayer rope is attributed to Pachomius the Great in the fourth century as an aid for illiterate monks to accomplish a consistent number of prayers and prostrations in their cells. Previously, monks would count their prayers by casting pebbles into a bowl, but this was cumbersome, and could not be easily carried about when outside the cell. The use of the rope made it possible to pray the Jesus Prayer unceasingly, whether inside the cell or out, in accordance with Paul the Apostle's injunction to "Pray without ceasing" (I Thessalonians 5:17).

It is said that the method of tying the prayer rope had its origins from the father of Orthodox monasticism, Anthony the Great. He started by tying a leather rope with a simple knot for every time he prayed Kyrie Eleison ("Lord have Mercy"), but the Devil would come and untie the knots to throw off his count. He then devised a way—inspired by a vision he had of the Theotokos—of tying the knots so that the knots themselves would constantly make the sign of the cross. This is why prayer ropes today are still tied using knots that each contain seven little crosses being tied over and over. The Devil could not untie it because the Devil is vanquished by the Sign of the Cross.

== See also ==
- Hesychasm
- Lestovka
- Prayer beads
- Rosary
- Tasbih
- Japamala
