= Wreath of Christ =

Prayer beads

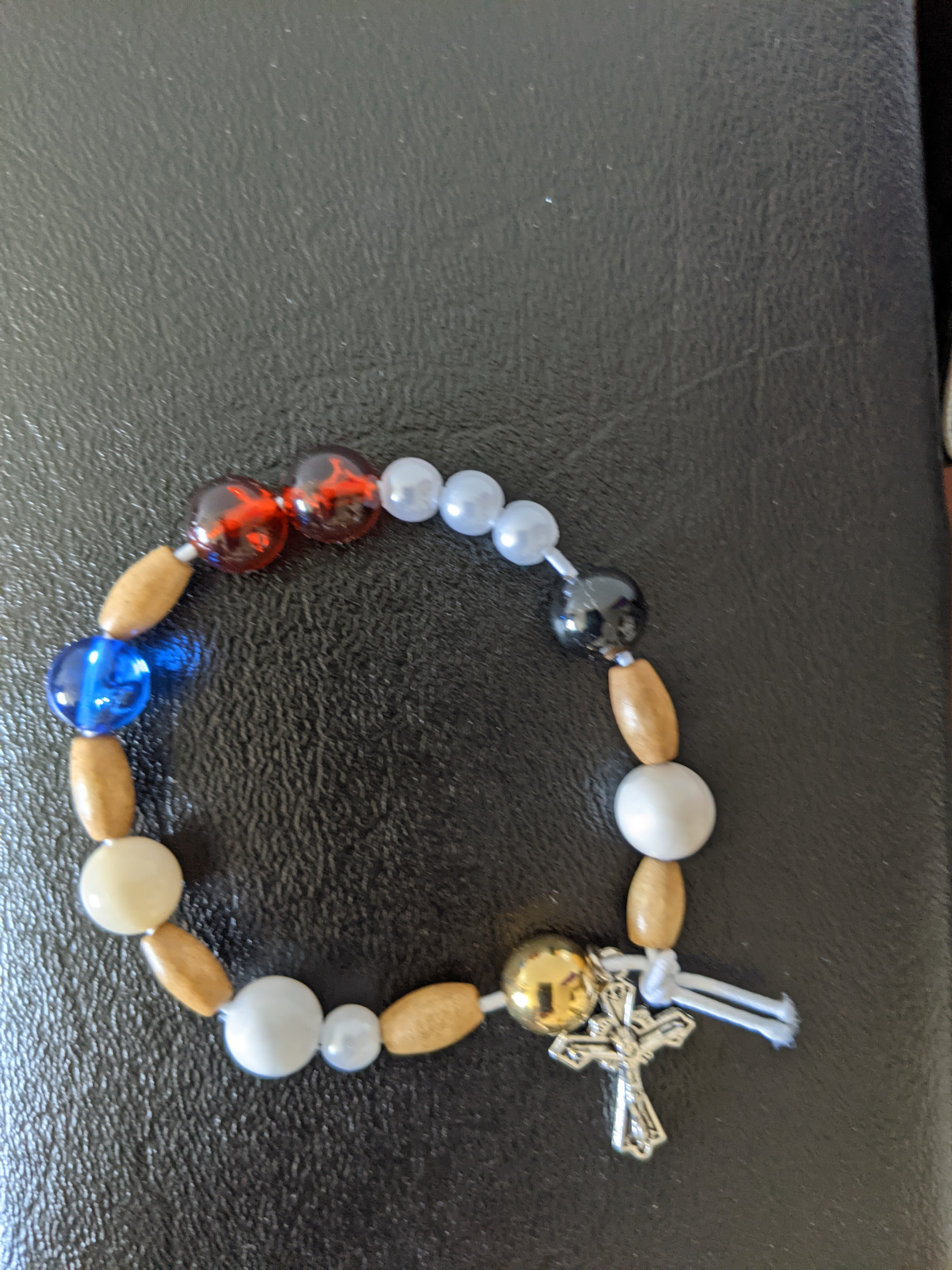
Wreath of Christ, a Lutheran rosary

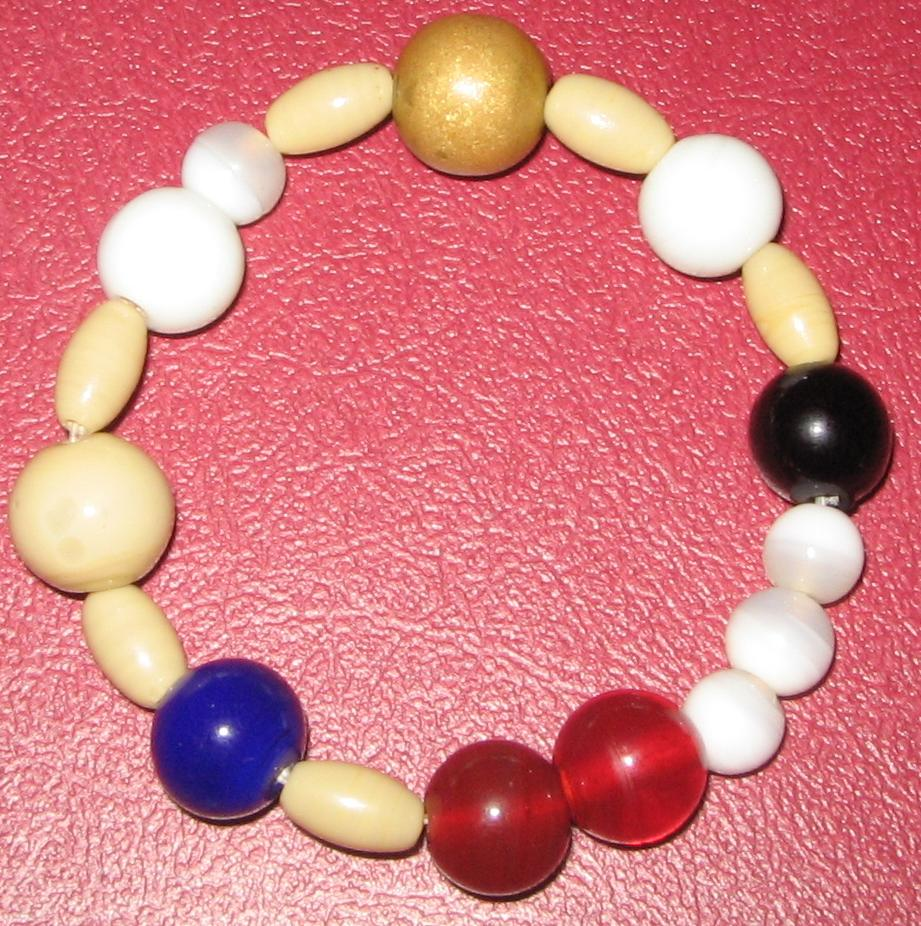
A Wreath of Christ

The Wreath of Christ (Swedish: Frälsarkransen; Danish and Norwegian: Kristuskransen), also known as the Lutheran rosary, are a set of prayer beads developed in 1995 by Swedish Evangelical Lutheran bishop emeritus Martin Lönnebo. The Wreath of Christ contains 18 beads, which are known as "pearls", with many including a crucifix. They are an often used devotion in the Lutheran Church after their popularization through the text Pearls of Life; the Wreath of Christ has been used in ecumenical Christian settings as well.

== Background ==
Bishop Lönnebo of the Lutheran Church of Sweden was stranded on an island in Greece for several days because of a storm. When he saw the Greek fishermen with their kombologia (which are in fact worry beads that have no religious or spiritual function), he was inspired to create the Wreath of Christ. He first developed, on paper, a set of Lutheran prayer beads where he gave all the pearls a specific meaning. After the return home to Sweden, he made the actual pearl ribbon, based on his sketches and started using it in his prayers. The devotion began to spread rapidly in Sweden and to other Lutheran countries.

== Pearls ==
The order starts at the golden "God" bead and goes counter-clockwise. In this order, the pearls symbolise the course of life, and also represent a catechism.

1. The bead of God
2. The bead of Silence
3. The I bead
4. The bead of Baptism
5. The bead of Silence
6. The Desert bead
7. The bead of Silence
8. The Carefree bead
9. The bead of Silence
10. Bead of God's love
11. Bead of God's love
12. Bead of Secrets
13. Bead of Secrets
14. Bead of Secrets
15. The bead of Darkness
16. The bead of Silence
17. The bead of Resurrection
18. The bead of Silence
19. Crucifix

== Gallery ==
An Evangelical-Lutheran icon of the crucifixion of Jesus, containing the Wreath of Christ, the set of Evangelical-Lutheran prayer beads (at Vadstena Abbey Church)

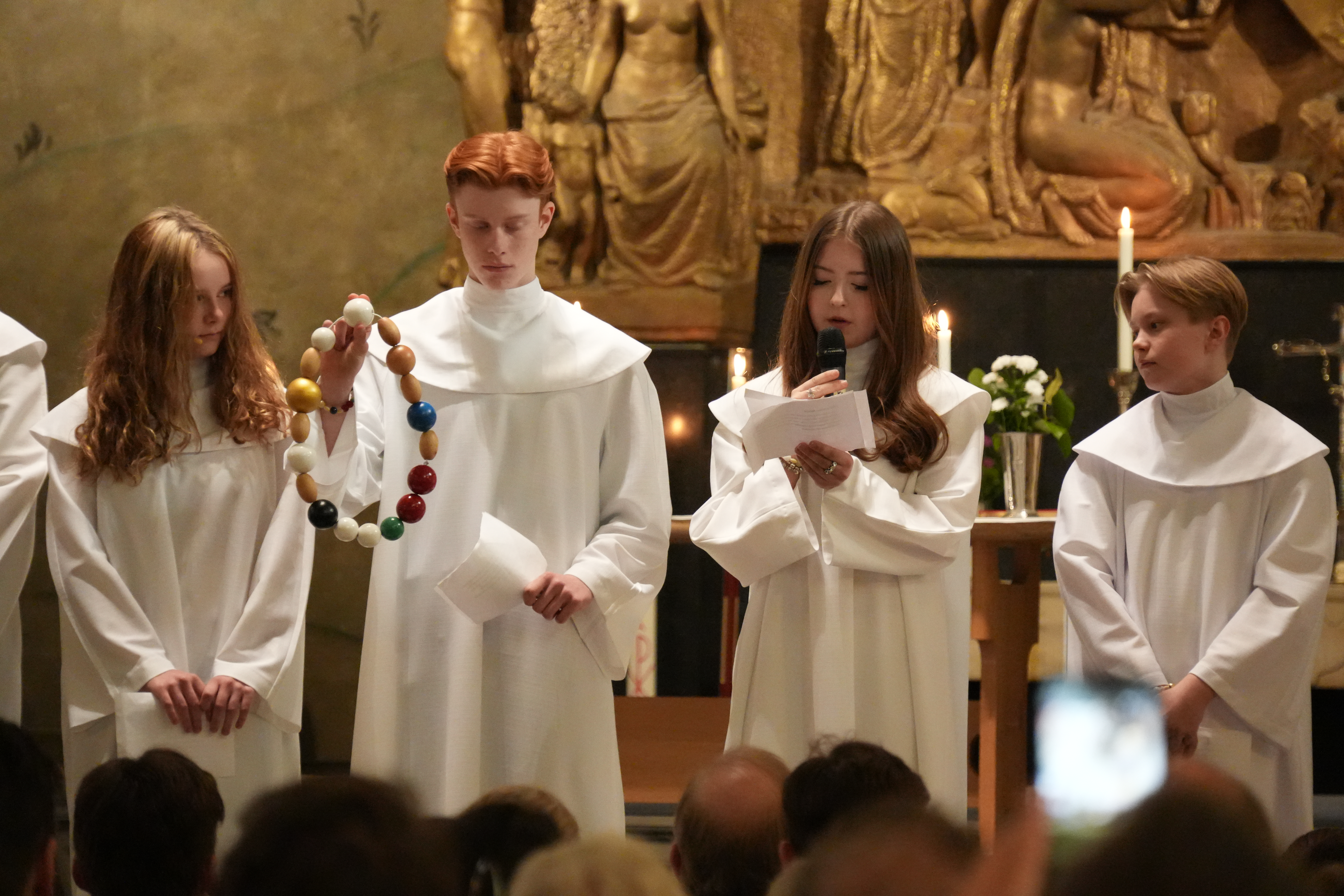
A group of confirmands in the Church of Sweden use an enlarged Wreath of Christ as a pedagocical tool during a Confirmation Mass in Oscar Church, Stockholm. They also wear the wreaths around their wrists.
