= Rosary =

Christian sacramental and Marian devotion

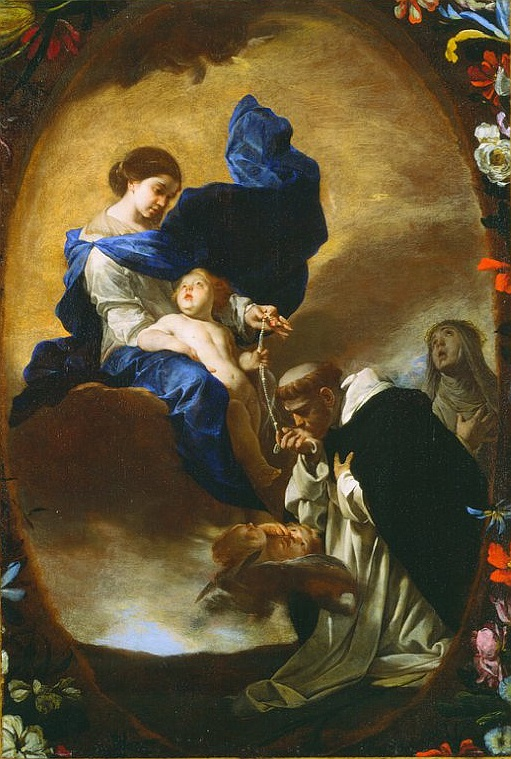
La Visione di San Domenico (The Vision of Saint Dominic), Bernardo Cavallino, 1640

The Rosary (/ˈroʊzəri/; Latin: rosarium, in the sense of "crown of roses" or "garland of roses"), formally known as the Psalter of Jesus and Mary (Latin: Psalterium Jesu et Mariae), also known as the Dominican Rosary (as distinct from other forms of rosary such as the Franciscan Crown, Bridgettine Rosary, Rosary of the Holy Wounds, etc.), refers to a set of prayers used primarily in the Catholic Church, and to the physical string of knots or beads used to count the component prayers. When referring to the prayer, the word is usually capitalized ("the Rosary", as is customary for other names of prayers, such as the Lord's Prayer, and the Hail Mary); when referring to the prayer beads as an object, it is written with a lower-case initial letter (e.g. "a rosary bead").

The prayers that compose the Rosary are arranged in sets of ten Hail Marys, called "decades". Each decade is preceded by one Lord's Prayer ("Our Father"), and traditionally followed by one Glory Be. Some Catholics also recite the "O my Jesus" prayer after the Glory Be; it is the best-known of the seven Fátima prayers that appeared in the early 20th century. Rosary prayer beads are an aid for saying these prayers in their proper sequence.

Usually, five decades are recited in a session. Each decade provides an opportunity to meditate on one of the Mysteries of the Rosary, which recall events in the lives of Jesus and his mother Mary.

In the 16th century Pope Pius V established a standard 15 Mysteries of the Rosary, based on long-standing custom. This groups the mysteries in three sets: the Joyful Mysteries, the Sorrowful Mysteries, and the Glorious Mysteries. In 2002, Pope John Paul II said it is fitting that a new set of five be added, termed the Luminous Mysteries, bringing the total number of mysteries to 20. The mysteries are prayed on specific days of the week; with the addition of the Luminous Mysteries on Thursday, the others are the Glorious on Sunday and Wednesday, the Joyful on Monday and Saturday, and the Sorrowful on Tuesday and Friday.

Over more than four centuries, several popes have promoted the Rosary as part of the veneration of Mary in the Catholic Church, and consisting essentially in meditation on the life of Christ. The rosary also represents the Catholic emphasis on "participation in the life of Mary, whose focus was Christ", and the Mariological theme "to Christ through Mary". A number of Evangelical-Lutherans pray the rosary, though with certain modifications, such as the use of the Pre-Trent version of the Hail Mary; some Anglicans have made use of the rosary in this modified form as well as its traditional form to a lesser extent.

== Praying the Rosary ==
Schematic diagram of the Rosary: • brown: Sign of the Cross; Apostles' Creed • blue: Our Father • blue/medium blue: introduction of the relevant Mystery; Our Father • pink: Hail Mary • pink/dark pink: Hail Mary; Glory Be • yellow: Hail Holy Queen; Sign of the Cross

=== Basic structure ===
The structure of the Rosary prayer, recited using the rosary beads, is as follows:

The Rosary is begun on the short strand:

- the sign of the cross (sometimes using the cross or crucifix)
- the Apostles' Creed (the cross or crucifix is held in the hand)
- the Lord's Prayer at the first large bead (for the needs of the Catholic Church and the intentions of the reigning pope)
- the Hail Mary on each of the next three beads (for the three theological virtues: faith, hope, and charity)
- the Glory Be in the space before the next large bead; and
- the Lord's Prayer at the second large bead

The praying of the decades then follows, repeating this cycle for each mystery:

- announcing the mystery (e.g. "The First Glorious Mystery is the resurrection of Jesus.")
- the Lord's Prayer on the large bead
- the Hail Mary on each of the ten adjacent small beads
- the Glory Be on the space before the next large bead

To conclude:

- the Hail Holy Queen (sometimes with other prayers, while holding the medal or large bead)
- the sign of the cross

=== Variations and common additions ===
Common pious additions to the Rosary are sometimes inserted after each decade and after recitation of the Salve Regina. Instead of ending each decade with the Gloria Patri, Pope Pius IX would add: "May the souls of the faithful departed, through the mercy of God, rest in peace."

Some Catholics piously add the Fatima Prayer after the Gloria Patri, still on the large bead. Some add the Miraculous Medal prayer "O Mary, conceived without sin, pray for us who have recourse to thee", while others add the Eucharistic prayer "O Sacrament Most Holy, O Sacrament Divine, All praise and all thanksgiving be every moment Thine" in honour of Jesus in the Blessed Sacrament. In the practice of the Brothers of the Christian Schools, there is a sixth decade for the intentions of the students, or the Virgin Mary.

Other popular additions include the shorter form of the Prayer to Saint Michael; the Memorare and a prayer for the intentions of the pope. In many cases, the Litany of Loreto is recited before the end.

In the practice of the Dominican Order, the beginning prayers of the rosary correspond to the preces that begin the Divine Office:

1. In the Name of the Father, and of the Son, and of the Holy Spirit. Amen.
2. Hail Mary, full of grace, the LORD is with Thee.
3. Blessed art Thou among women, and Blessed is the Fruit of Thy Womb, Jesus.
4. O LORD, open my lips.
5. And my mouth will proclaim Your praise.
6. Incline Your aid to me, O God.
7. O LORD, make haste to help me.
8. Glory be to the Father, and to the Son, and to the Holy Spirit, as it was in the beginning, is now, and ever shall be, world without end. Amen.

=== Group recitation of the Rosary ===
When a group recites the Rosary, it is customary that the prayers that constitute the decades are divided into two parts. The second part of the Our Father begins with "Give us this day our daily bread"; the second part of the Hail Mary begins with "Holy Mary, Mother of God"; and the second part of the Glory Be with "As it was in the beginning". This lends itself to antiphonal prayer.

Sometimes, a chosen leader will recite the first half of the prayer while other participants recite the second. In another style, recitation of the first part of the prayers is rotated among different persons while still maintaining the traditional leader-congregation alternation.

== Mysteries of the Rosary ==
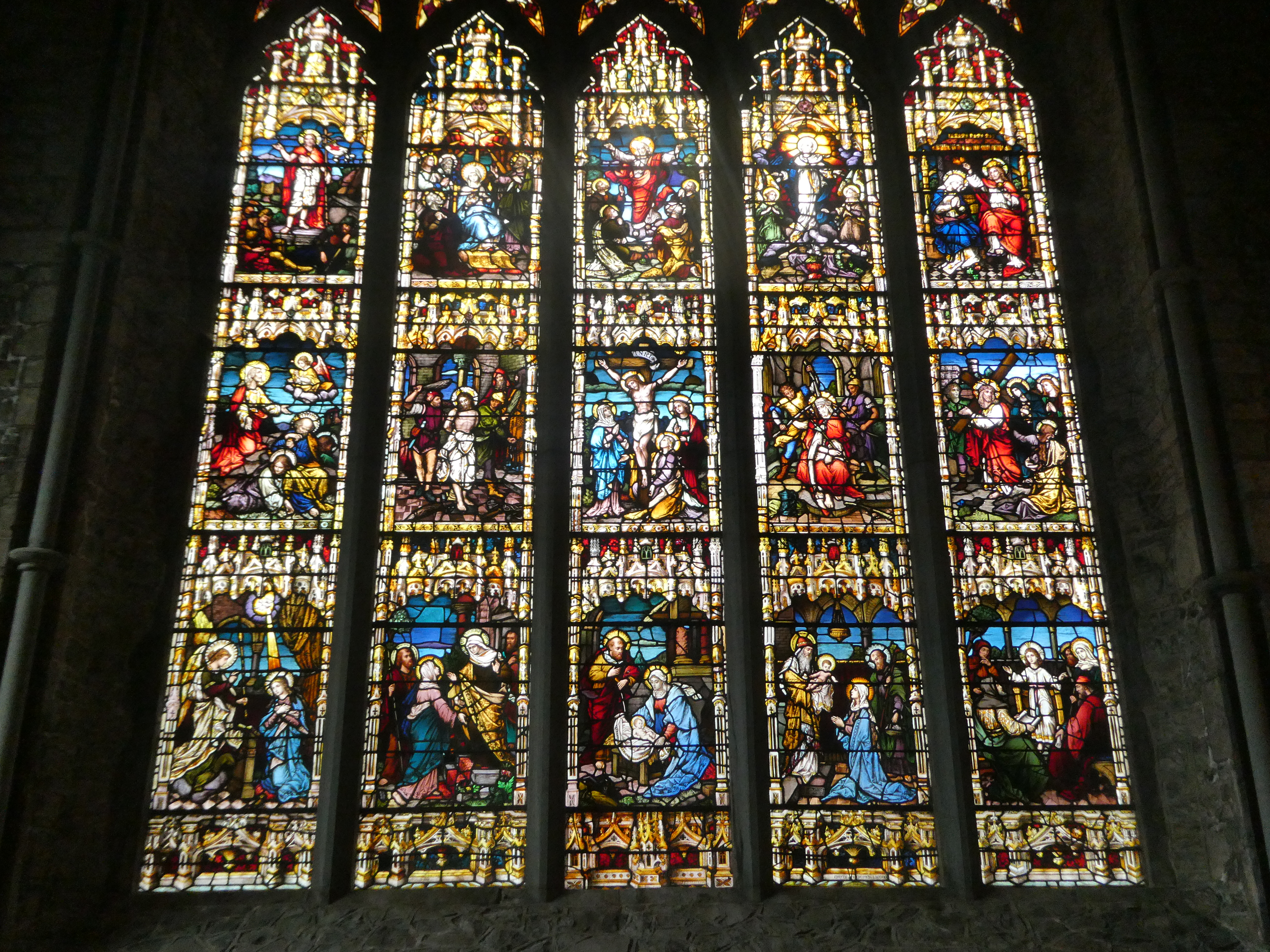
Rosary window in the Black Abbey, Kilkenny, Ireland. Top row: Glorious Mysteries – Resurrection, Pentecost, Ascension, Assumption, Coronation of the Virgin. Middle row: Sorrowful Mysteries – Agony in the Garden, Scourging, Crucifixion, Crowning with Thorns, Carrying the Cross. Bottom row: Joyful Mysteries – Annunciation, Visitation, Nativity, Presentation, Finding in the Temple.

The Mysteries of the Rosary are meditations on episodes in the life and death of Jesus from the Annunciation to the Ascension and beyond. These are traditionally grouped by fives into themed sets known as the Joyful (or Joyous) Mysteries, the Sorrowful Mysteries, and the Glorious Mysteries. Pope John Paul II recommended an additional set called the Luminous Mysteries (or the "Mysteries of Light") in his apostolic letter Rosarium Virginis Mariae (October 2002). The original Mysteries of Light were written by George Preca, the only Maltese official Catholic saint, and later reformed by the pope.

Typically, a spiritual goal known as a "fruit" is also assigned to each mystery. Below are listed from the appendix of Louis Marie de Montfort's book Secret of the Rosary for the original 15 mysteries, with other possible fruits being listed in other pamphlets bracketed:

Joyful Mysteries

1. The Annunciation. Fruit of the Mystery: Humility.
2. The Visitation. Fruit of the Mystery: Love of Neighbor.
3. The Birth of Jesus. Fruit of the Mystery: Poverty, Detachment from the things of the world, Contempt of Riches, Love of the Poor.
4. The Presentation of Jesus at the Temple. Fruit of the Mystery: Gift of Wisdom and Purity of mind and body (Obedience).
5. The Finding of Jesus in the Temple. Fruit of the Mystery: True Conversion (Piety, Joy of Finding Jesus).

Luminous Mysteries

1. The Baptism of Jesus in the Jordan. Fruit of the Mystery: Openness to the Holy Spirit, the Healer.
2. The Wedding at Cana. Fruit of the Mystery: To Jesus through Mary, Understanding of the ability to manifest-through faith.
3. Jesus' Proclamation of the Kingdom of God. Fruit of the Mystery: Trust in God (Call of Conversion to God).
4. The Transfiguration. Fruit of the Mystery: Desire for Holiness.
5. The Institution of the Eucharist. Fruit of the Mystery: Adoration.

Sorrowful Mysteries

1. The Agony in the Garden. Fruit of the Mystery: Sorrow for Sin, Uniformity with the Will of God.
2. The Scourging at the Pillar. Fruit of the Mystery: Mortification (Purity).
3. The Crowning with Thorns. Fruit of the Mystery: Contempt of the World (Moral Courage).
4. The Carrying of the Cross. Fruit of the Mystery: Patience.
5. The Crucifixion and Death of our Lord. Fruit of the Mystery: Perseverance in Faith, Grace for a Holy Death, Forgiveness.

Glorious Mysteries

1. The Resurrection. Fruit of the Mystery: Faith.
2. The Ascension. Fruit of the Mystery: Hope, Desire to Ascend to Heaven.
3. The Descent of the Holy Spirit. Fruit of the Mystery: Love of God, Holy Wisdom to know the truth and share it with everyone, Divine Charity, Worship of the Holy Spirit.
4. The Assumption of Mary. Fruit of the Mystery: Union with Mary and True Devotion to Mary.
5. The Coronation of the Virgin. Fruit of the Mystery: Perseverance and an Increase in Virtue (Trust in Mary's Intercession).

=== Mysteries prayer schedule ===
Traditionally the full Rosary consisted of praying all 15 traditional mysteries (Joyful, Sorrowful and Glorious) together. Alternatively, a single set of five mysteries can be prayed each day, according to the following convention:

| Day of praying | Standard / Traditional | With the Luminous Mysteries |
|---|---|---|
| Sunday | During Advent: The Joyful Mysteries; During Lent: The Sorrowful Mysteries; During Easter and Ordinary Time: The Glorious Mysteries | The Glorious Mysteries |
| Monday | The Joyful Mysteries | The Joyful Mysteries |
| Tuesday | The Sorrowful Mysteries | The Sorrowful Mysteries |
| Wednesday | The Glorious Mysteries | The Glorious Mysteries |
| Thursday | The Joyful Mysteries | The Luminous Mysteries |
| Friday | The Sorrowful Mysteries | The Sorrowful Mysteries |
| Saturday | The Glorious Mysteries | The Joyful Mysteries |

== Duration ==
Praying the full Rosary typically takes about 20 to 30 minutes, but this can vary. A quicker pace might allow one to finish in around 15–20 minutes, while a slower, more meditative approach, especially in a group, could extend to 25–30 minutes or longer. Some people even pray just a single decade, which can take about 2–3 minutes.

== Devotions and spirituality ==
Pope John Paul II placed the Rosary at the very center of Christian spirituality and called it "among the finest and most praiseworthy traditions of Christian contemplation." Pope Pius XI is quoted as saying, for example, "The Rosary is a powerful weapon to put the demons to flight."

Saints and popes have emphasized the meditative and contemplative elements of the rosary and provided specific teachings for how the rosary should be prayed, for instance the need for "focus", "respect", "reverence" and "purity of intention" during rosary recitations and contemplations. Scriptural meditations concerning the rosary are based on the Christian tradition of Lectio Divina (literally "divine reading") as a way of using the Gospel to start a conversation between the person and Christ. Padre Pio, a rosary devotee, said: "Through the study of books one seeks God; by meditation one finds him." From the sixteenth century onwards, Rosary recitations often involved "picture texts" that further assisted meditation. Such imagery continues to be used to depict the Mysteries of the rosary.

References to the Rosary have been part of various reported Marian Apparitions spanning two centuries. The reported messages from these apparitions have influenced the spread of Rosary devotion worldwide. In Quamquam pluries, Pope Leo XIII related Rosary devotions to Saint Joseph and granted indulgences in favour of Christians who, in the month of October, would have added the Prayer to Saint Joseph at the end of the Holy Rosary.

Praying the Rosary may be prescribed by priests as a type of penance after the Sacrament of Penance. Penance is not generally intended as a "punishment"; rather, it is meant to encourage meditation upon and spiritual growth from past sins.

== History ==
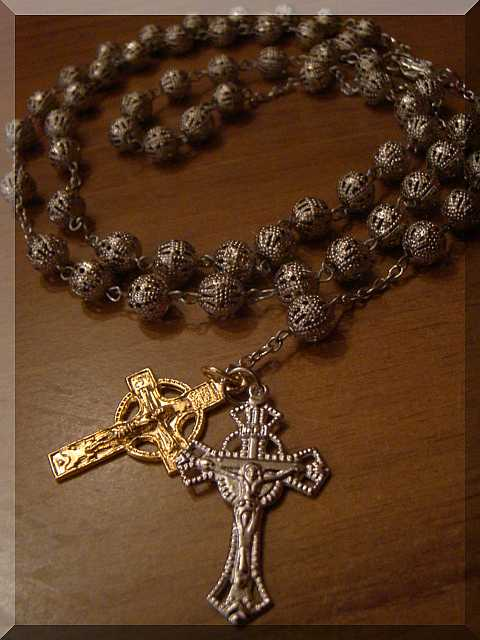
An Egyptian, Coptic-style rosary featuring an extra Coptic crucifix

Knotted prayer ropes were used in early Christianity; the Desert Fathers are said to have created the first such, using knots to keep track of the number of times they said the Jesus prayer or the 150 psalms.

According to tradition, the prayer of the Rosary was given to Dominic de Guzmán in an apparition of the Blessed Virgin Mary during the year 1208 in the church of Prouille. This Marian apparition received the title of Our Lady of the Rosary. This traditional origin for the Rosary has been generally accepted by the Church and by many popes, primarily before the 17th century, but also by later figures such as Pope Leo XIII and Pope Pius XI in official documents such as encyclicals. Louis De Montfort also affirmed this tradition in his writings. According to Herbert Thurston, it is certain that in the course of the twelfth century and before the birth of Dominic, the practice of reciting the Ave Maria 50 or 150 times had become generally familiar. According to 20th century editions of the Catholic Encyclopedia, the story of Dominic's devotion to the Rosary and supposed apparition of Our Lady of the Rosary does not appear in any documents of the Catholic Church or the Order of Preachers prior to the writings of the Dominican Alanus de Rupe, some 250 years after Dominic. However, recent scholarship by Donald H. Calloway seeks to refute this claim. Leonard Foley said that although Mary's giving the Rosary to Dominic is recognized as a legend, the development of this prayer form owes much to the Order of Preachers.

The practice of meditation during the praying of the Hail Mary is attributed to Dominic of Prussia (1382–1460), a Carthusian monk who termed it "Life of Jesus Rosary". The German monk from Trier added a sentence to each of the 50 Hail Marys, using quotes from scripture (which at that time followed the name "Jesus", before the intercessory ending was added during the Counter-Reformation). In 1569, the papal bull Consueverunt Romani Pontifices by the Dominican Pope Pius V officially established the devotion to the Rosary in the Catholic Church.

From the 16th to the early 20th century, the structure of the Rosary remained essentially unchanged. There were 15 mysteries, one for each of the 15 decades. According to John Henry Newman, Mariology is always Christocentric. During the 20th century, the addition of the Fatima Prayer to the end of each decade became common. There were no other changes until 2002, when John Paul II suggested the five optional Luminous Mysteries; variations of these had previously been proposed by George Preca, and were implemented during the mid-20th century by figures such as Patrick Peyton.

=== Devotional growth ===
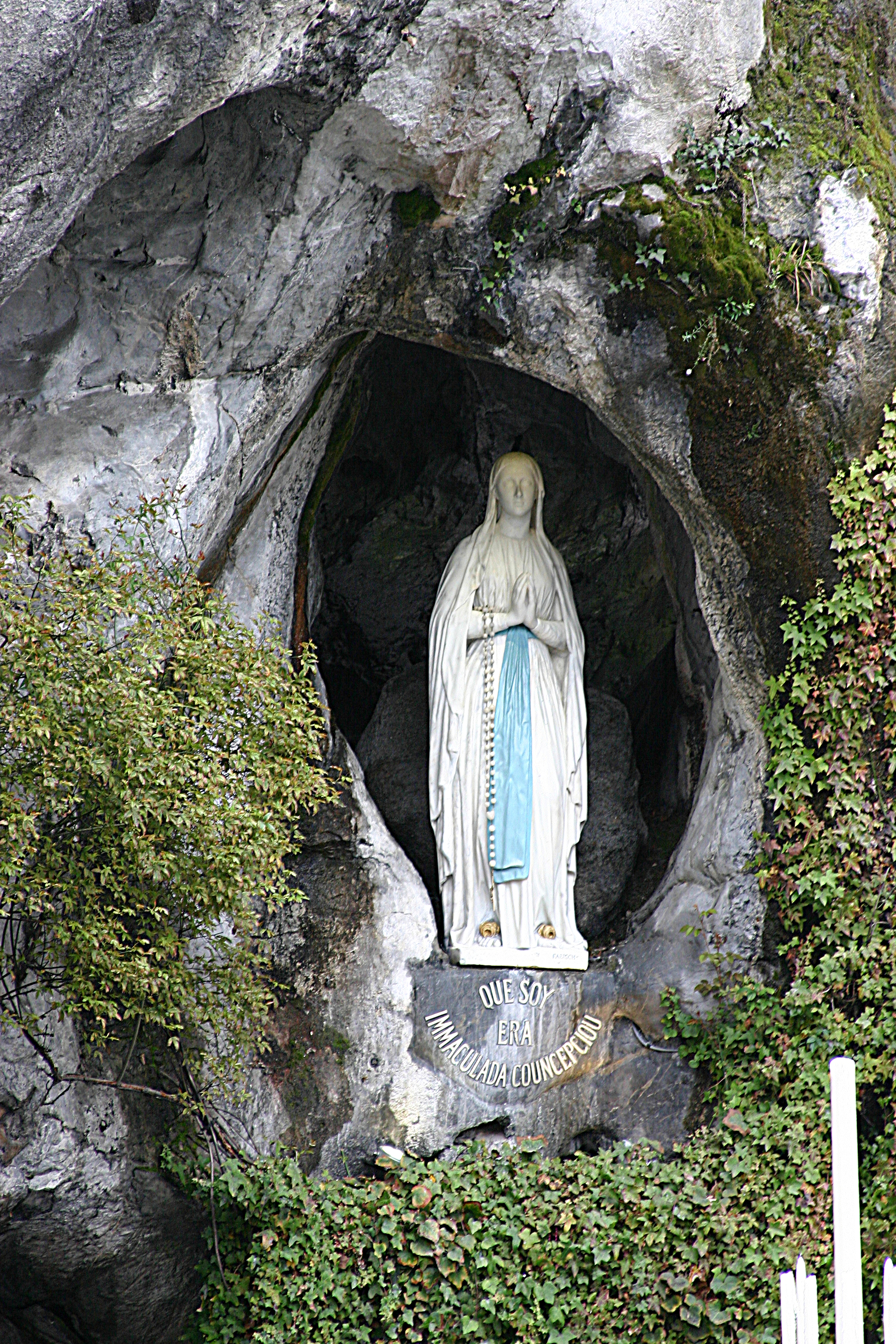
Our Lady of Lourdes appearing at Lourdes with rosary beads

Through the preaching of de Rupe, Rosary confraternities began to be erected shortly before 1475.

When Penal Laws in Ireland restricted or banned the Mass, the Rosary became a substitute prayer ritual within private homes. During the 18th century, de Montfort elaborated on the importance of the rosary and emphasized that it should be prayed with attention, devotion, and modesty (reverence).

In Brazil, two million men engage in a movement called Terço dos Homens ("Men's Rosary"). It consists of weekly meetings to pray a set of mysteries. In neighboring Hispanic countries, the movement is called Rosario de Hombres Valientes.

The theologian Romano Guardini described the Catholic emphasis on the Rosary as "participation in the life of Mary, whose focus was Christ." This opinion was expressed earlier by Leo XIII who considered the rosary a way to accompany Mary in her contemplation of Christ.

== Papal endorsements ==
During the 16th century, Pope Pius V associated the rosary with the General Roman Calendar by instituting the Feast of Our Lady of Victory (later changed to Our Lady of the Rosary), which is celebrated on 7 October.

Pope Leo XIII issued twelve encyclicals and five apostolic letters concerning the rosary and added the invocation "Queen of the Most Holy Rosary" to the Litany of Loreto. Leo XIII wrote that the Rosary is the one road to God from the faithful to the mother and from her to Jesus, and through Jesus to the Father, and that the Rosary was a vital means to participate with the life of Mary and to find the way to Christ. Leo instituted the custom of praying the Rosary daily during the month of October.

The Rosary as a family prayer was endorsed by Pope Pius XII in his encyclical Ingruentium malorum: "In vain is a remedy sought for the wavering fate of civil life, if the family, the principle and foundation of the human community, is not fashioned after the pattern of the Gospel...We affirm that the custom of the family recitation of the Holy Rosary is a most efficacious means." Pope Pius XII and his successors actively promoted veneration of the Virgin in Lourdes and Fatima, which is credited with a new resurgence of the Rosary within the Catholic Church.

Pope John XXIII deemed the Rosary of such importance that on 28 April 1962, he issued an apostolic letter where he appealed for recitation of the Rosary in preparation for the Second Vatican Council.

Pope John Paul II issued the apostolic letter Rosarium Virginis Mariae which emphasized the Christocentric nature of the Rosary as a meditation on the life of Christ. He said: "Through the Rosary the faithful receive abundant grace, as by the hands of the Mother of the Redeemer."

On 3 May 2008, Pope Benedict XVI stated that the Rosary was experiencing a new springtime: "It is one of the most eloquent signs of love that the young generation nourish for Jesus and his Mother."

The Congregation for Divine Worship's directory of popular piety and the liturgy emphasizes the Christian meditation/meditative aspects of the Rosary, and states that the Rosary is essentially a contemplative prayer which requires "tranquility of rhythm or even a mental lingering which encourages the faithful to meditate on the mysteries of the Lord's life."

=== Indulgence ===
The Enchiridion Indulgentiarum of 2004 confirmed the partial indulgence for the Prayer to Saint Joseph. For the Marian Rosary he provided for plenary indulgence on condition that it is piously recited in a church or oratory (with others or alone), in a family, religious community, an association of the faithful or—more generally—in a meeting of a plurality of people who come together honourable for this purpose.

=== Rosary encyclicals and Apostolic Letters ===
- Consueverunt Romani Pontifices – Pius V
- List of encyclicals of Pope Leo XIII on the Rosary
- Ingravescentibus Malis – Pius XI
- Ingruentium malorum – Pius XII
- Grata recordatio – John XXIII
- Christi Matri – Paul VI
- Rosarium Virginis Mariae – John Paul II

== Rosary beads ==
Rosary beads provide a physical method of keeping count of the number of Hail Marys said as the mysteries are contemplated. By not having to keep track of the count mentally, the mind is free to meditate on the mysteries. While most rosaries contain five groups of ten beads, called "decades", some other rosaries, particularly those used by religious orders, contain fifteen decades and since the early 20th century twenty decade rosaries have been manufactured.

Rosaries normally take the form of a loop from which hangs a short strand holding a crucifix or cross. The loop contains all the decades, the beads of which may be called Hail Mary beads as they are used for reciting the Hail Mary prayer, as well as one fewer Our Father beads, used for saying the Lord's Prayer, than there are decades. To make them stand out to the user's touch, Our Father beads are often larger, made of a different material, or spaced further apart from the Hail Mary beads. The pair of decades that do not have an Our Father bead between them instead have an attachment to a shorter strand of beads. This shorter strand has five beads on it and may connect to the main loop by a center medal, a knot or a large bead. The five beads are one Our Father bead, three Hail Mary beads, another Our Father bead then and finally a cross or crucifix. A five-decade rosary consists of a "total" of 59 beads. Bishop Fulton J. Sheen designed an alternative set of rosary beads called the World Mission Rosary, with decades in different colours, green representing Africa, red representing America, white representing Europe, yellow representing Asia, and blue representing Australasia and the Pacific Islands, the whole being intended to sustain prayers for the church's missionary activities across the whole world.

Although counting the prayers on a string of beads is customary, the prayers of the Rosary do not require beads, but can be said using any type of counting device, by counting on the fingers, or by counting mentally.

=== Single-decade rosaries ===
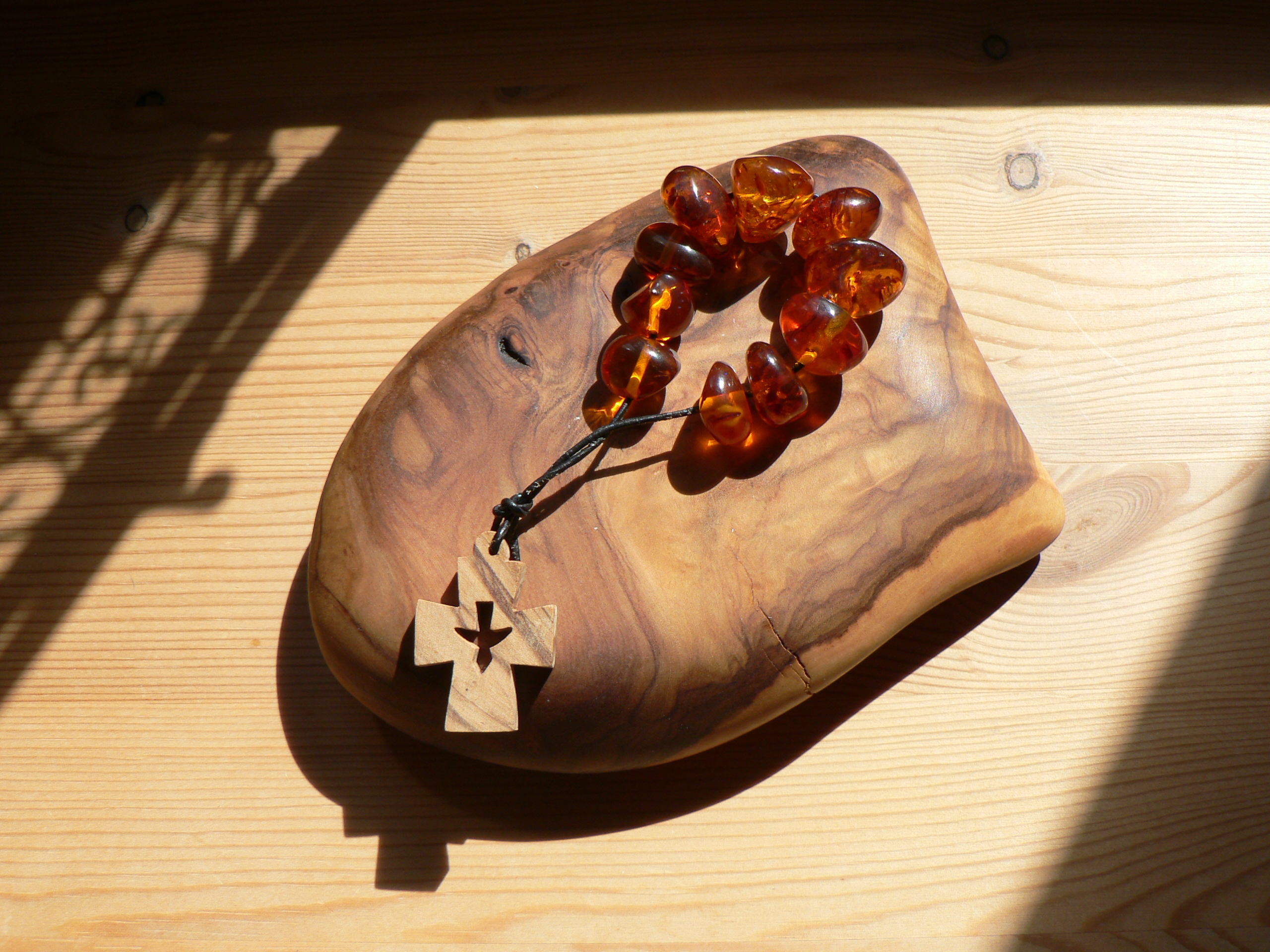
A single-decade rosary

Single-decade rosaries can also be used: the devotee counts the same ring of ten beads repeatedly for every decade. During religious conflict in 16th- and 17th-century Ireland severe legal penalties were prescribed against practising Catholics. Small, easily hidden rosaries were thus used to avoid identification and became known as Irish penal rosaries. Symbols of specific meanings were often carved onto the crucifixes such as: a hammer to signify the nails of the cross, cords to represent the scourging, a chalice to recall the Last Supper, or a crowing rooster signifying the denial of Peter.

=== Materials and distribution ===
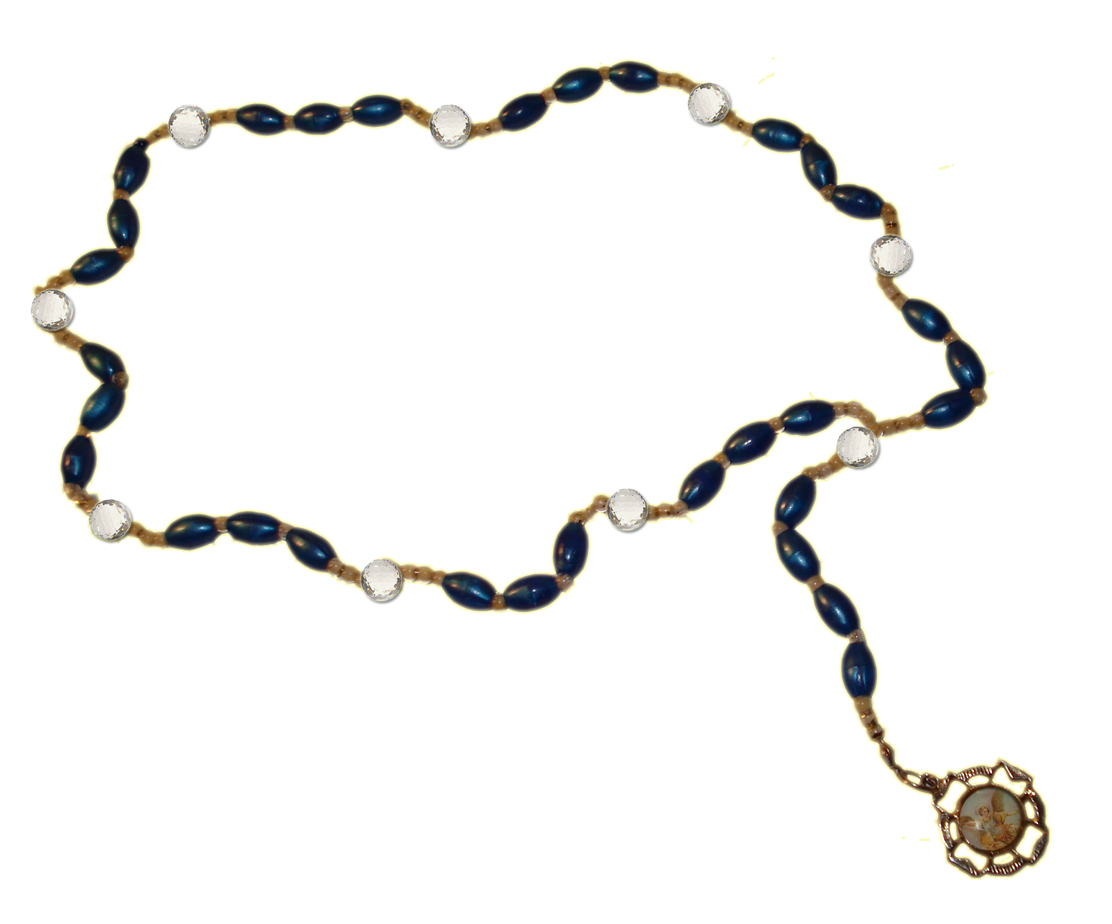
A Saint Michael Chaplet

The beads can be made from any materials, including wood, bone, glass, crushed flowers, semi-precious stones such as agate, jet, amber, or jasper, or precious materials including coral, crystal, silver, and gold. Beads may be made to include enclosed sacred relics or drops of holy water. Rosaries are sometimes made from the seeds of the "rosary pea" or "bead tree." Today, the vast majority of rosary beads are made of glass, plastic, or wood. It is common for beads to be made of material with some special significance, such as jet from the shrine of Saint James the Greater at Santiago de Compostela, or olive seeds from the Garden of Gethsemane. In rare cases, beads are made of expensive materials, from gold and silver, to mother of pearl and Swarovski black diamonds. Early rosaries were strung on thread, often silk, but modern ones are more often made as a series of chain-linked beads. Most rosaries used in the world today have simple and inexpensive plastic or wooden beads connected by cords or strings. Italy has a strong manufacturing presence in medium- and high-cost rosaries.

There are a number of rosary-making clubs around the world that make and distribute rosaries to missions, hospitals, prisons, etc. free of charge. Our Lady's Rosary Makers produce some 7 million rosaries annually that are distributed to those deemed to be in economic and spiritual need.

== Other uses ==
=== Wearing rosary beads ===
Rosary beads are often worn by Christians as a sign of their faith in various parts of the world, including the Dominican Republic, El Salvador, Honduras, India, Palestine and Uganda.

Louis-Marie Grignion de Montfort encouraged Christians to also wear the rosary beads, stating that doing so "eased him considerably". Many religious orders wear the rosary as part of their habit. A rosary hanging from the belt often forms part of the Carthusian habit.

Canon Law §1171 provides that sacred objects, which are designated for divine worship by dedication or blessing, are to be treated reverently and are not to be employed for profane or inappropriate use even if they are owned by private persons. As such, according to Edward McNamara, professor of liturgy at the Regina Apostolorum University:

If the reason for wearing a rosary is as a statement of faith, as a reminder to pray it, or some similar reason "to the glory of God", then there is nothing to object to. It would not be respectful to wear it merely as jewelry. This latter point is something to bear in mind in the case of wearing a rosary around the neck. In the first place, while not unknown, it is not common Catholic practice. While a Catholic may wear a rosary around the neck for a good purpose, he or she should consider if the practice will be positively understood in the cultural context in which the person moves. If any misunderstanding is likely, then it would be better to avoid the practice ... Similar reasoning is observed in dealing with rosary bracelets and rings, although in this case there is far less danger of confusion as to meaning. They are never mere jewelry but are worn as a sign of faith.

=== Wearing rosary rings ===
A rosary ring is a finger ring with eleven knobs on it, ten round ones and one crucifix, representing one decade of a rosary. These and other kinds of religious rings were especially popular during the 15th and the 16th centuries. Rosary rings are sometimes given to Catholic nuns at the time of their solemn profession. Ring rosaries have also been used in cases of religious persecutions against Catholics, as they are small and can be easily hidden. An example is the Irish penal rosary also with 10 beads. However, they were also sometimes worn for protection and adornment at times when Catholicism was not persecuted, as it would be more difficult to break or wear down a rosary ring, rather than a traditional rosary threaded onto a string.

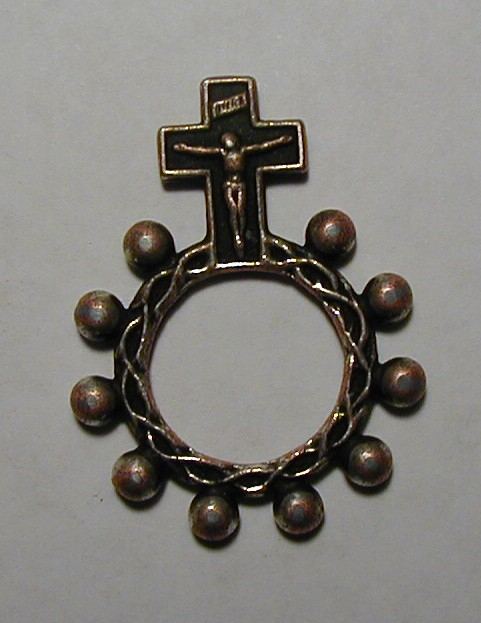
Basque ring rosary

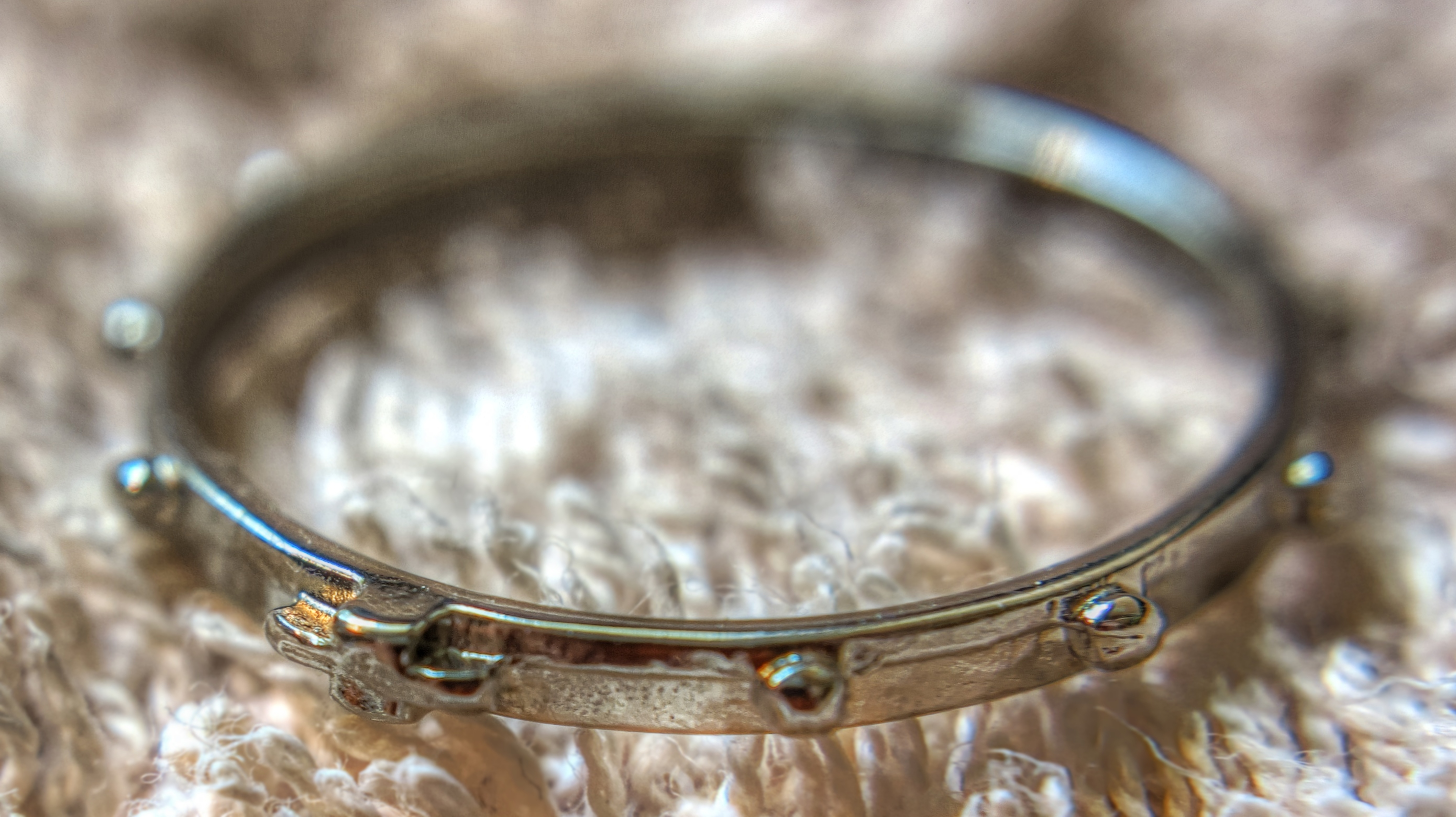
Single-decade rosary ring to be worn around a finger

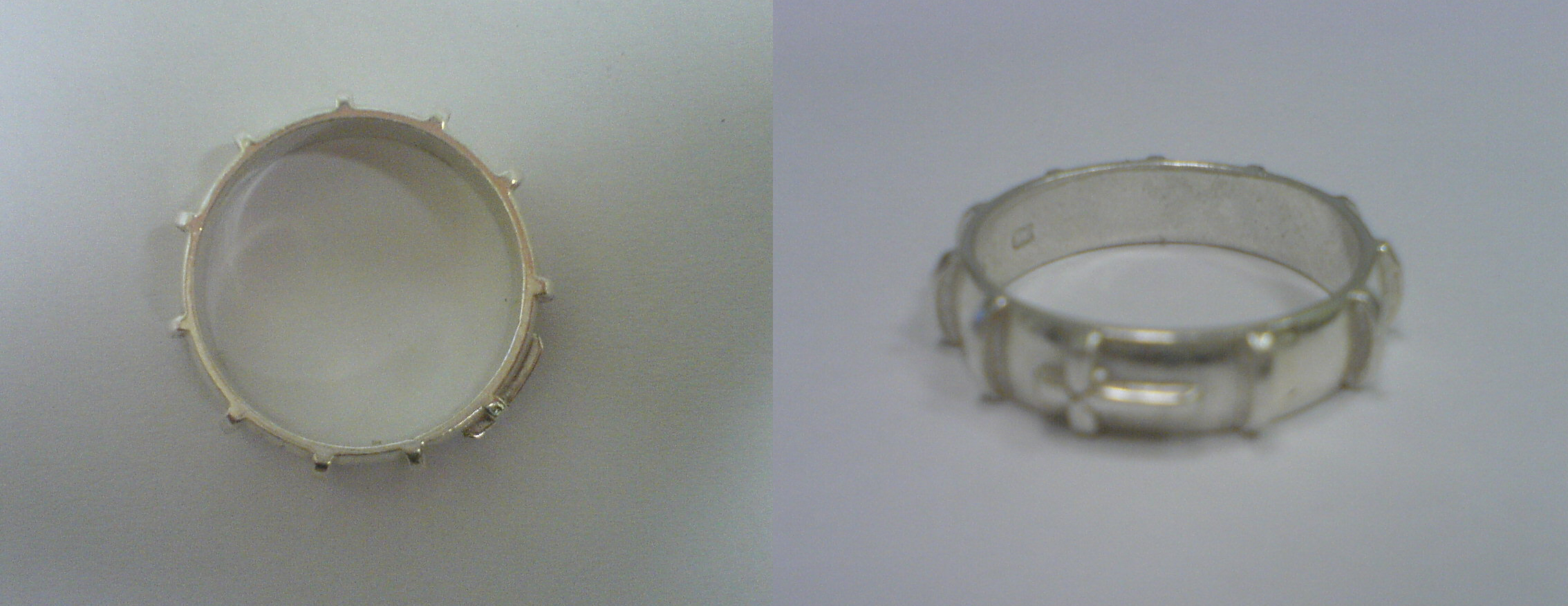
A rosary ring of Russian origin

=== Wearing rosary bracelets ===
A rosary bracelet is one with ten beads and often a cross or medal. Another form is the rosary card. A rosary card is either one with a "handle" that moves like a slide rule to count the decade, or it has a whole rosary with bumps similar to Braille and ancient counting systems.

=== Use in vehicles ===
Many Christians hang rosaries from the rear-view mirror of their automobiles as a witness of their faith and protection as they drive.

=== Use in homes ===
Some households that cannot afford Christian artwork or a crucifix simply hang up a rosary as a focal point for prayer.

== Rosary recordings and products ==
Audio recordings of the Rosary aim to help with aspects of prayer such as pacing, memorization, and by providing inspirational meditations in the form of commentary. Some are sponsored by various groups such as the Knights of Columbus, and religious congregations. In 2008, Vatican Radio released a 4-CD set of Pope Benedict XVI praying the Rosary in Latin. Ecclesiastical Latin was used because "we have received requests not only from Italy but from places such as Germany and other countries. So we have used this language for the Rosary which everyone understands easily and because it is the universal language of the Church."

In October 2019, the Vatican launched an "electronic rosary" with ten black agate and hematite beads, and a metal cross that detects movement. It is linked to the "Click to Pray eRosary" mobile app designed to help Catholic users pray for world peace and contemplate the Gospel. The rosary can be worn as a bracelet, and is activated by making the Sign of the cross. The app also gives visual and audio explanations of the Rosary.

== Rosary-based devotions ==
- Novenas that include recitation of the Rosary are popular among Catholics. The traditional method consists of praying the Rosary along with the other component prayers of the Novena on nine consecutive days.
- The Servite Rosary – originated with the Servite Order, it consists of seven groups of seven beads. It is often said in connection with the Seven Dolours of Mary.
- The Franciscan Crown – a devotion that recalls seven joyful episodes in the life of the Blessed Virgin Mary. The practice originated among the Franciscans in early 15th-century Italy. The themes resemble the 12th-century Gaudes, Latin praises that ask Mary to rejoice because God has favoured her in various ways.
- 54-day Rosary Novena – consists of two parts, 27 days each. It is a series of Rosaries in honor of the Virgin Mary, reported as a private revelation in 1884 by Fortuna Agrelli in Naples, Italy. This Novena is performed by praying five decades of the Rosary each day for twenty-seven days in petition. The second phase which immediately follows consists of five decades each day for twenty-seven days in thanksgiving, and is prayed whether or not the petition has been granted. During the Novena, the meditations rotate among the Joyful, Sorrowful, and Glorious mysteries.
- Peace Rosary – also known as the "Workers' Rosary" or the "Peace Chaplet", it is popular with devotees of Our Lady of Medjugorje. The Chaplet later became a basis for a prayer for the seven gifts of the Holy Spirit, known as the Chaplet in Honour of the Holy Spirit, and has been translated into many languages.

== Other denominations ==
Many similar prayer practices exist in other Christian denominations, each with its own set of prescribed prayers and its own form of prayer beads (known in some traditions as the Chotki), such as the prayer rope in Eastern Orthodox Christianity. These other devotions and their associated beads are usually referred to as "chaplets". The Rosary is sometimes prayed by other Christians, especially in the Evangelical-Lutheran Churches, the Anglican Communion, and the Old Catholic Church.

Another example of Rosary-based prayers includes the interdenominational Ecumenical Miracle Rosary, "a set of prayers and meditations which covers key moments in the New Testament."

=== Evangelical-Lutheranism ===
A number of Evangelical-Lutherans pray the Rosary. There are two common formats that Evangelical-Lutherans use to pray the rosary. The traditional method used by Evangelical-Lutherans is largely the same as the way that Roman Catholics pray the rosary, though the Pre-Trent version of the Hail Mary is prayed (which omits "Holy Mary, mother of God, pray for us sinners, now and at the hour of our death"). Another version, envisaged in the 20th century, replaces the Hail Mary with the Jesus Prayer. The only time the "Hail Mary" is said is at the end of the Mysteries on the medal, where it is then replaced with the "Pre-Trent" version of the prayer (which omits "Holy Mary, mother of God, pray for us sinners, now and at the hour of our death"). The final prayer on the Evangelical-Lutheran rosary uses the Pre-Trent Hail Mary, or the Magnificat, or Martin Luther's "Evangelical Praise of the Mother of God".

The Wreath of Christ is used in the Evangelical-Lutheran Church of Sweden and has spread into other Evangelical-Lutheran denominations from there. Containing 18 beads and a crucifix, it is often used as a tool for reflection and meditation, being learned in Confirmation classes. Some members of the Church of Sweden of high-church or evangelical Catholic churchmanship will pray the traditional rosary, sometimes in an ecumenical setting with Roman Catholics.

=== Anglicanism ===
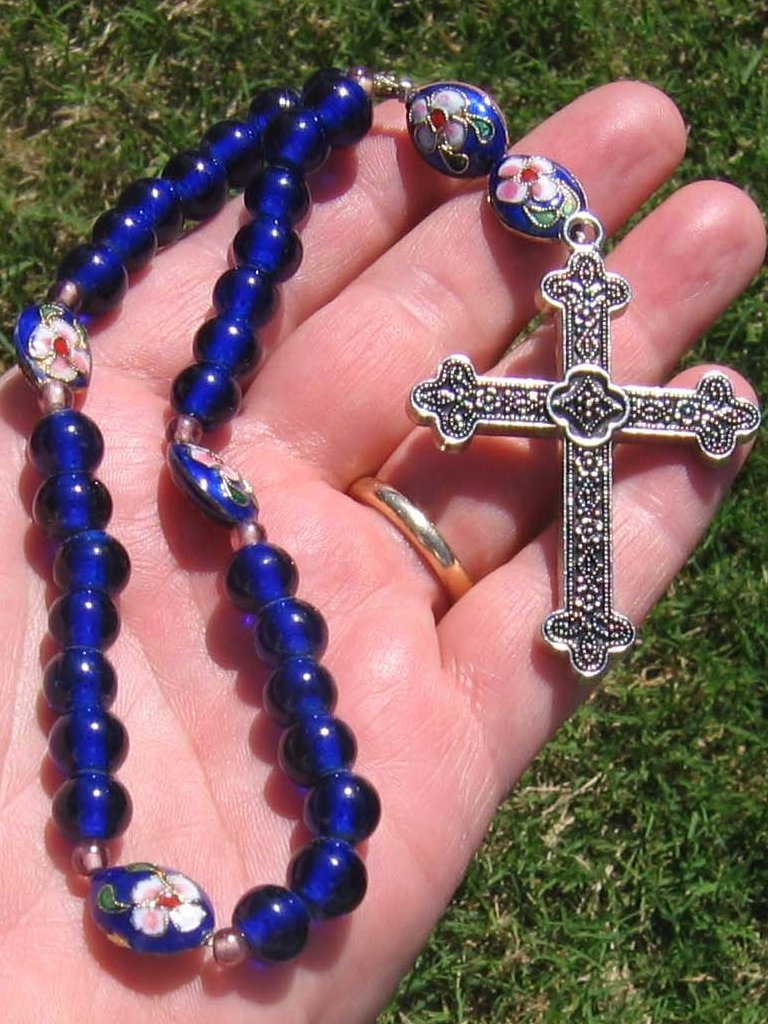
Anglican prayer beads

The use of the Rosary is fairly common among Anglicans of Anglo-Catholic churchmanship. Many Anglo-Catholic prayer books and manuals of devotion, such as Saint Augustine's Prayer Book contain the Rosary along with other Marian devotions. The public services of the Anglican churches, as contained in the Book of Common Prayer, do not directly invoke the Blessed Virgin or any other saint in prayer as the Thirty-Nine Articles reject the practice of praying to saints, but many Anglo-Catholics feel free to do so in their private devotions. Anglicans who pray the Rosary tend not to use the Luminous Mysteries or the Fátima decade prayer.

Anglican prayer beads, also known informally as the "Anglican rosary", are a recent innovation created in the 1980s. They consist of four "weeks" (the equivalent of a decade) of seven beads each. The weeks are separated from each other by single beads termed "cruciform beads". A variety of different prayers may be said, the most common being the Jesus Prayer. Anglican Prayer Beads are not a Marian devotion, and there are no appointed meditations. Although it is sometimes called the "Anglican rosary", it is distinct from the Rosary of Our Lady as prayed by Catholics, Lutherans, Anglicans, and other Western Christians.

== Churches named for the Rosary ==
Catholic Marian church buildings around the world named in honor of the rosary include:

- The Shrine of the Virgin of the Rosary of Pompei in Italy.
- Our Lady of the Rosary Basilica in the archdiocesan seat of Rosario province, Argentina.
- The Sanctuary of Our Lady of the Rosary of San Nicolás in the neighboring sufragan diocese of Diocese of San Nicolás de los Arroyos.
- Our Lady of Pompeii in New York City, which is named for the Our Lady of the Rosary of Pompeii.
- The Rosary Basilica in Lourdes, Nossa Senhora do Rosário in Porto Alegre, Brazil
- The Chapel of the Virgin of the Rosary (1531–1690) in Puebla City, Mexico.
- Our Lady of The Rosary in San Diego, California.
Rosary Basilica, Fatima, Portugal, 1953

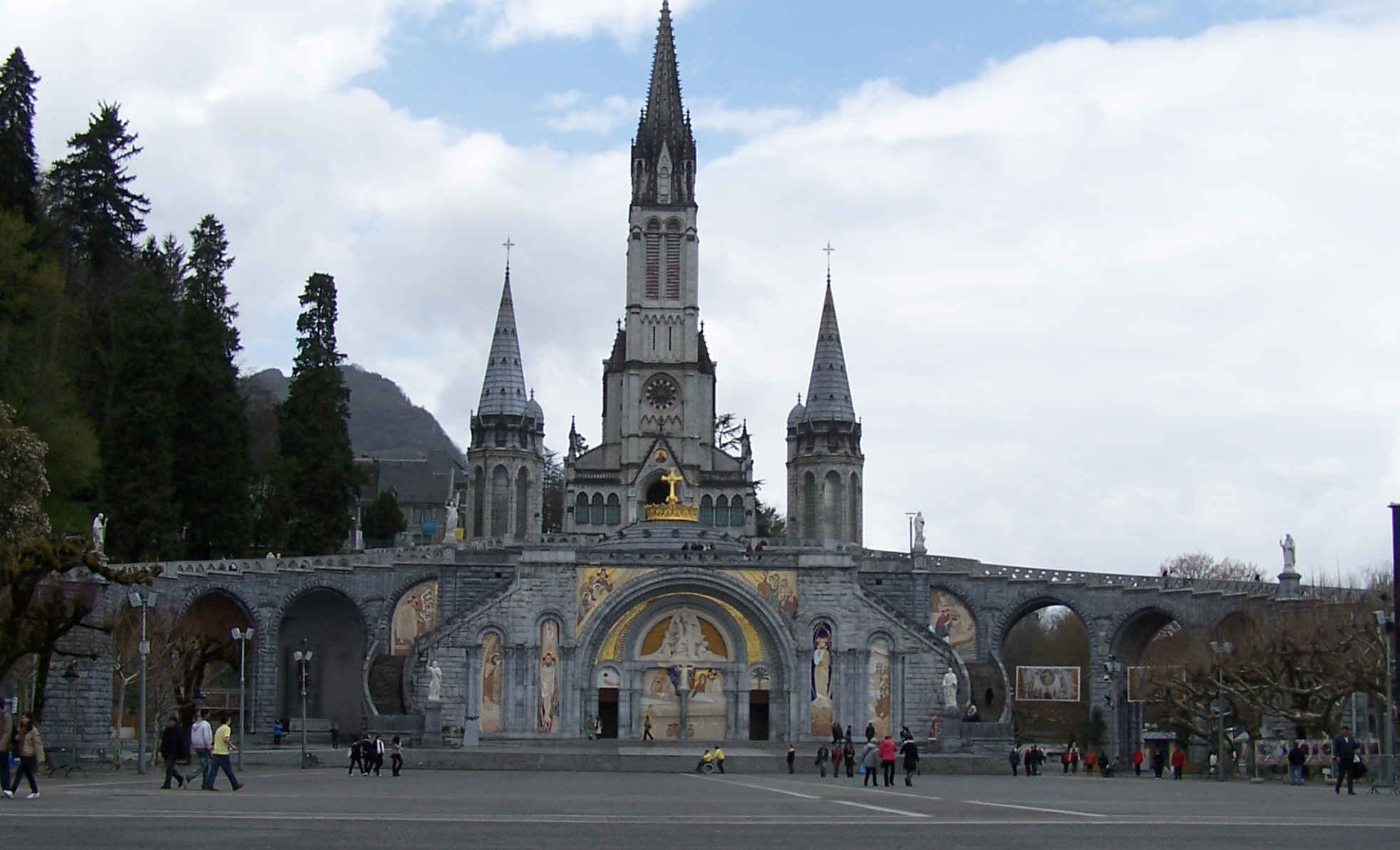
Rosary Basilica, Lourdes, France, 1899

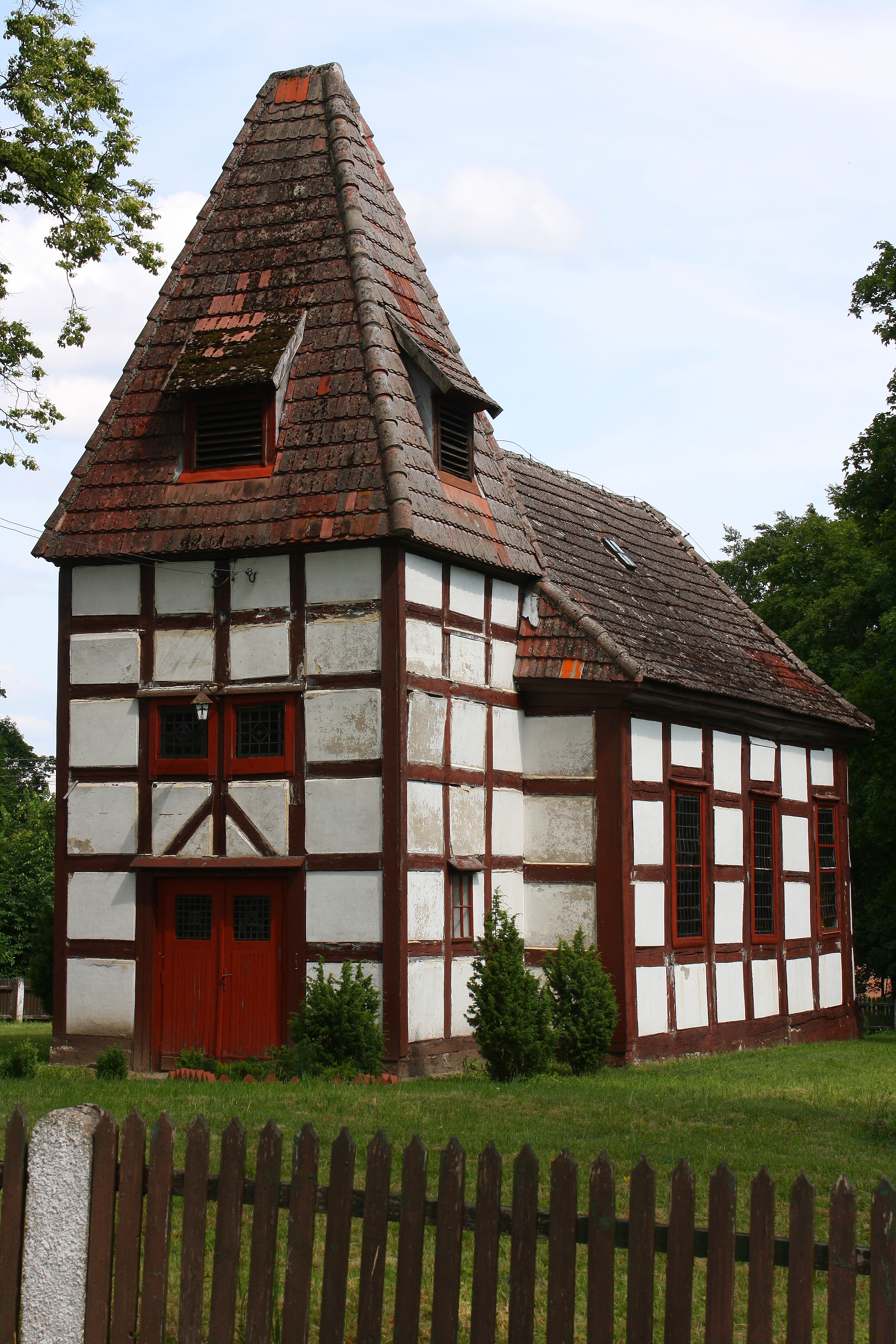
Our Lady of the Rosary, Drawień, Poland, 1695

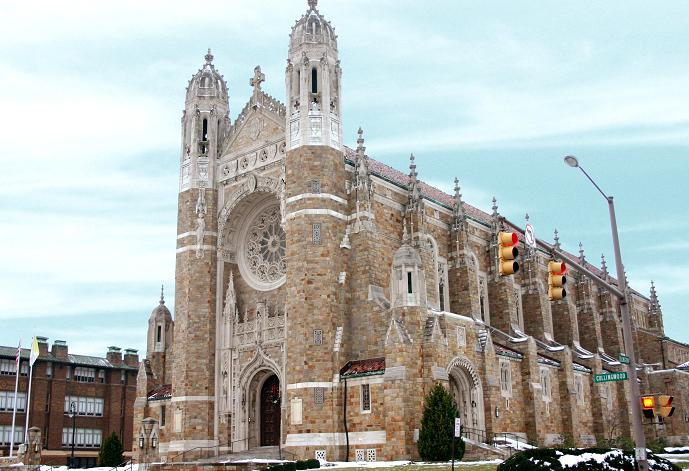
Rosary Cathedral, Toledo, Ohio, 1931

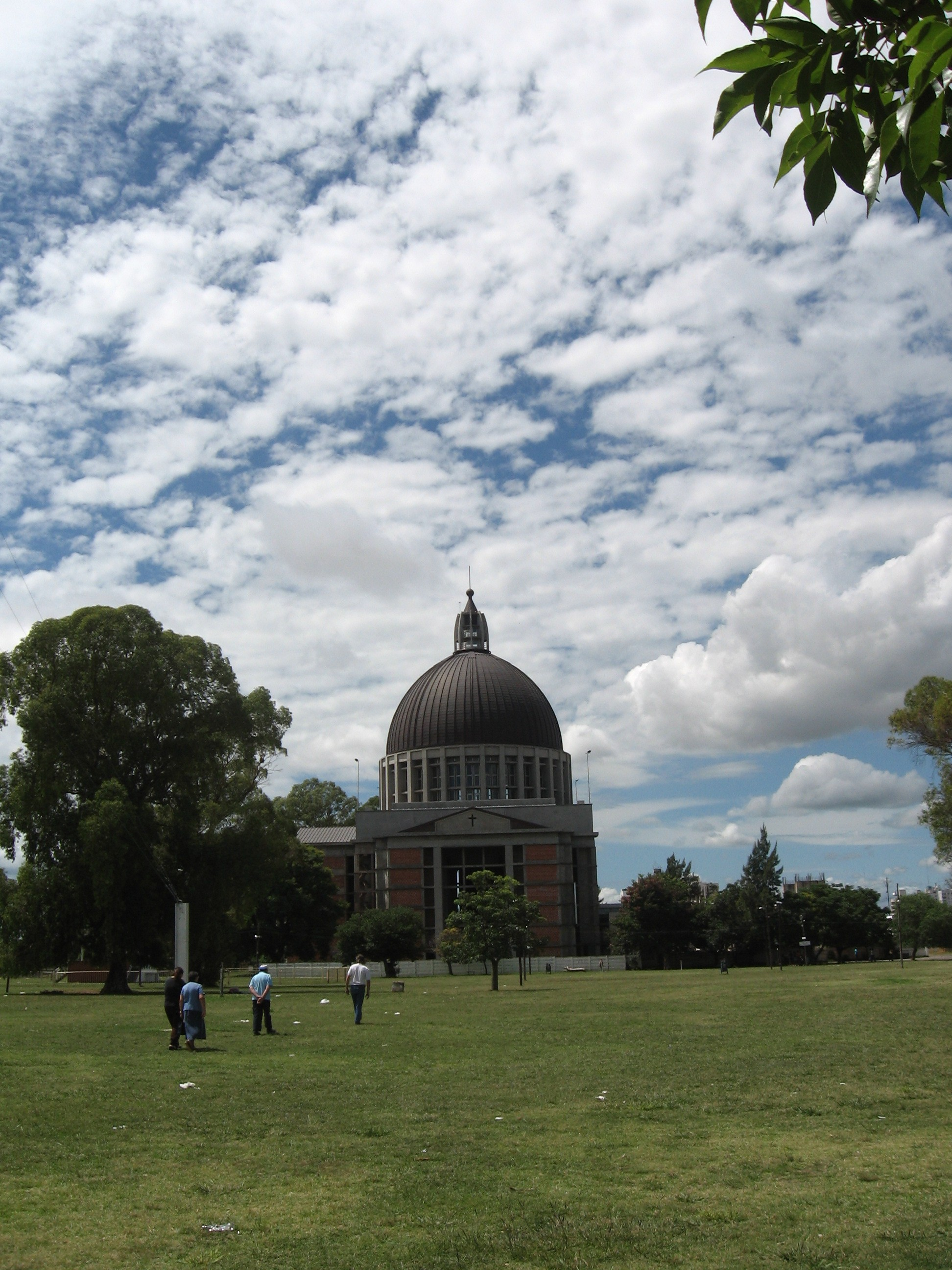
Sanctuary of Our Lady of the Rosary of San Nicolás, Buenos Aires province, Argentina

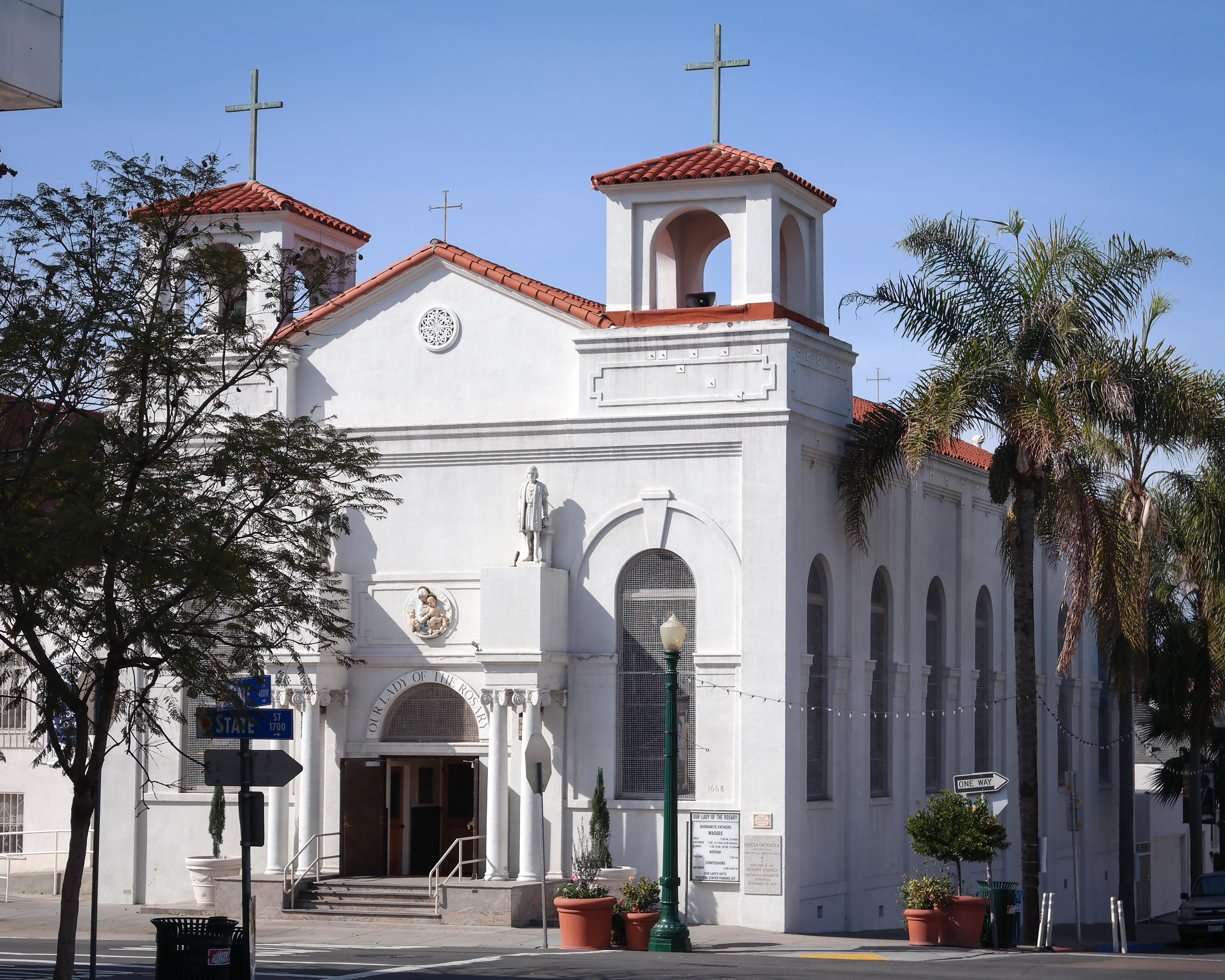
Our Lady of The Rosary in San Diego, California

== In Marian art ==
Since the 16th century, the rosary began to appear as an element in Catholic Marian art. One notable depiction of the rosary in Marian art is seen in Caravaggio's Madonna of the Rosary oil canvas painting in Vienna. Other depictions are shown below.

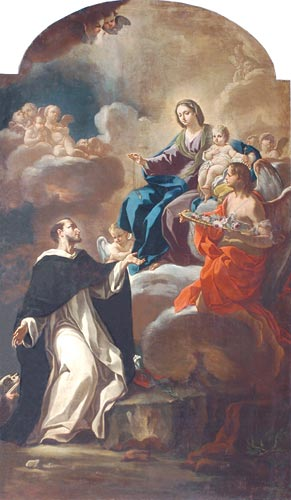
Madonna and rosary by Nicola Porta

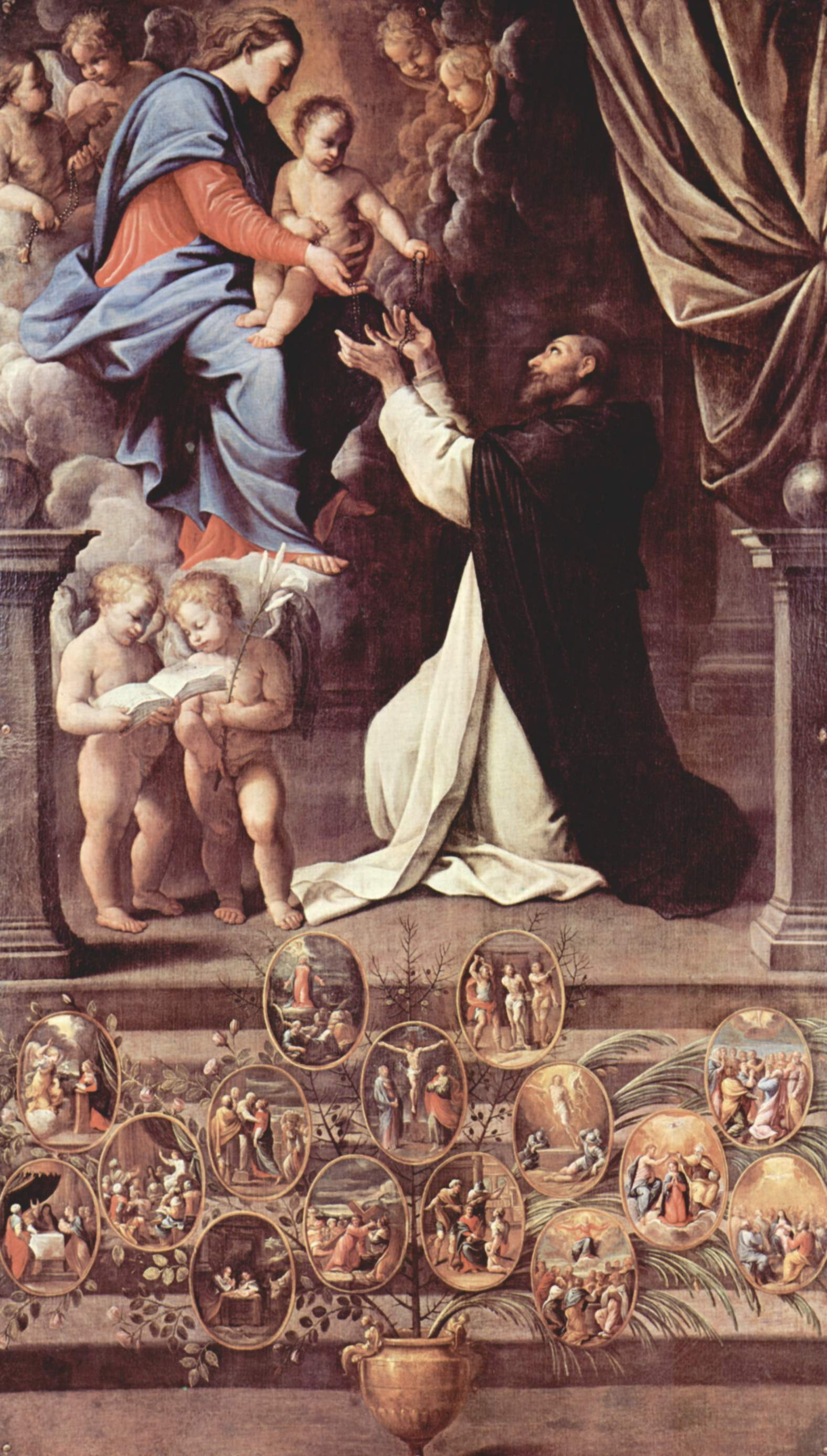
Madonna with rosary, by Guido Reni, 1596

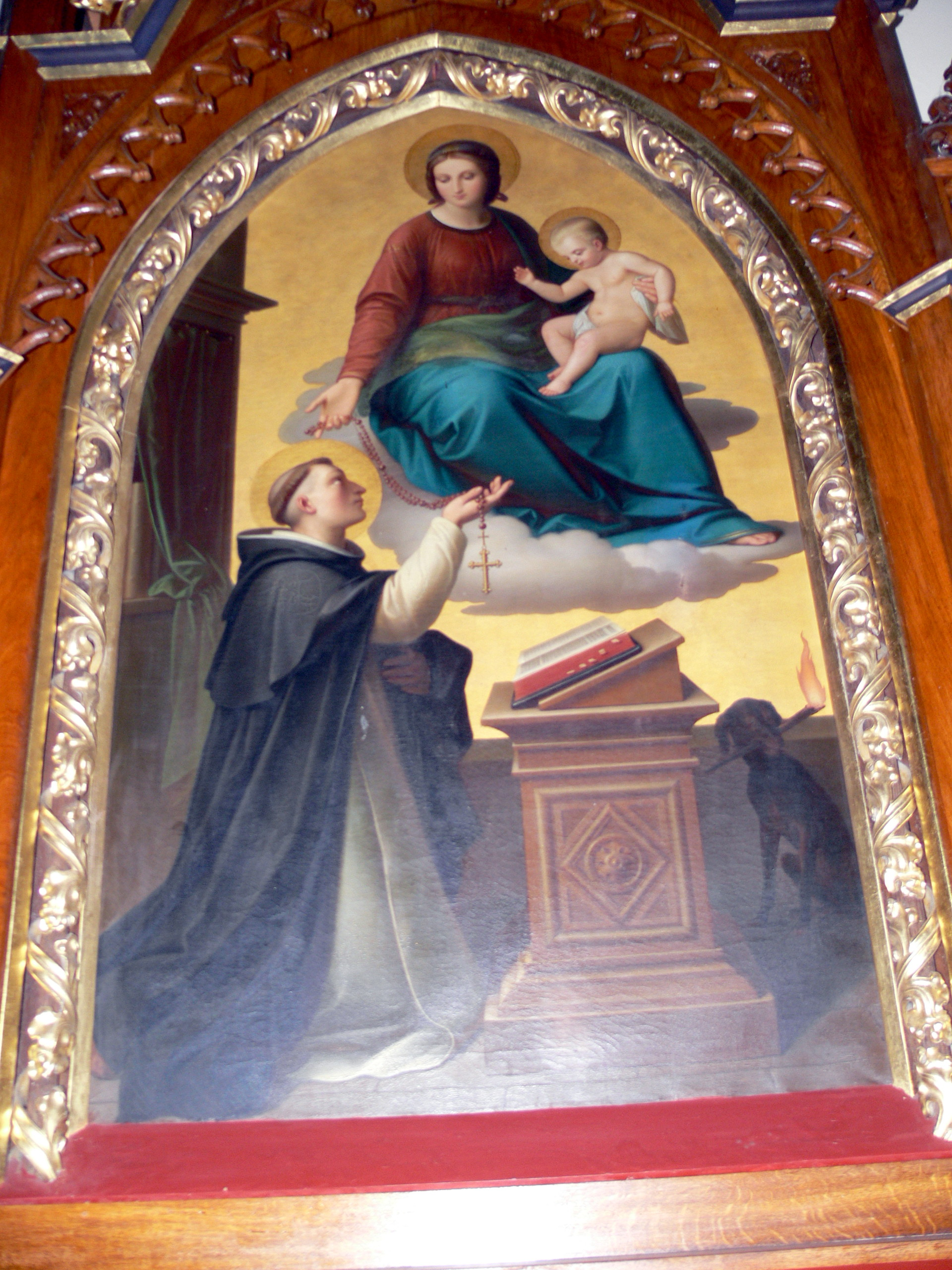
Madonna offering Saint Dominic rosary by August Palme, 1860

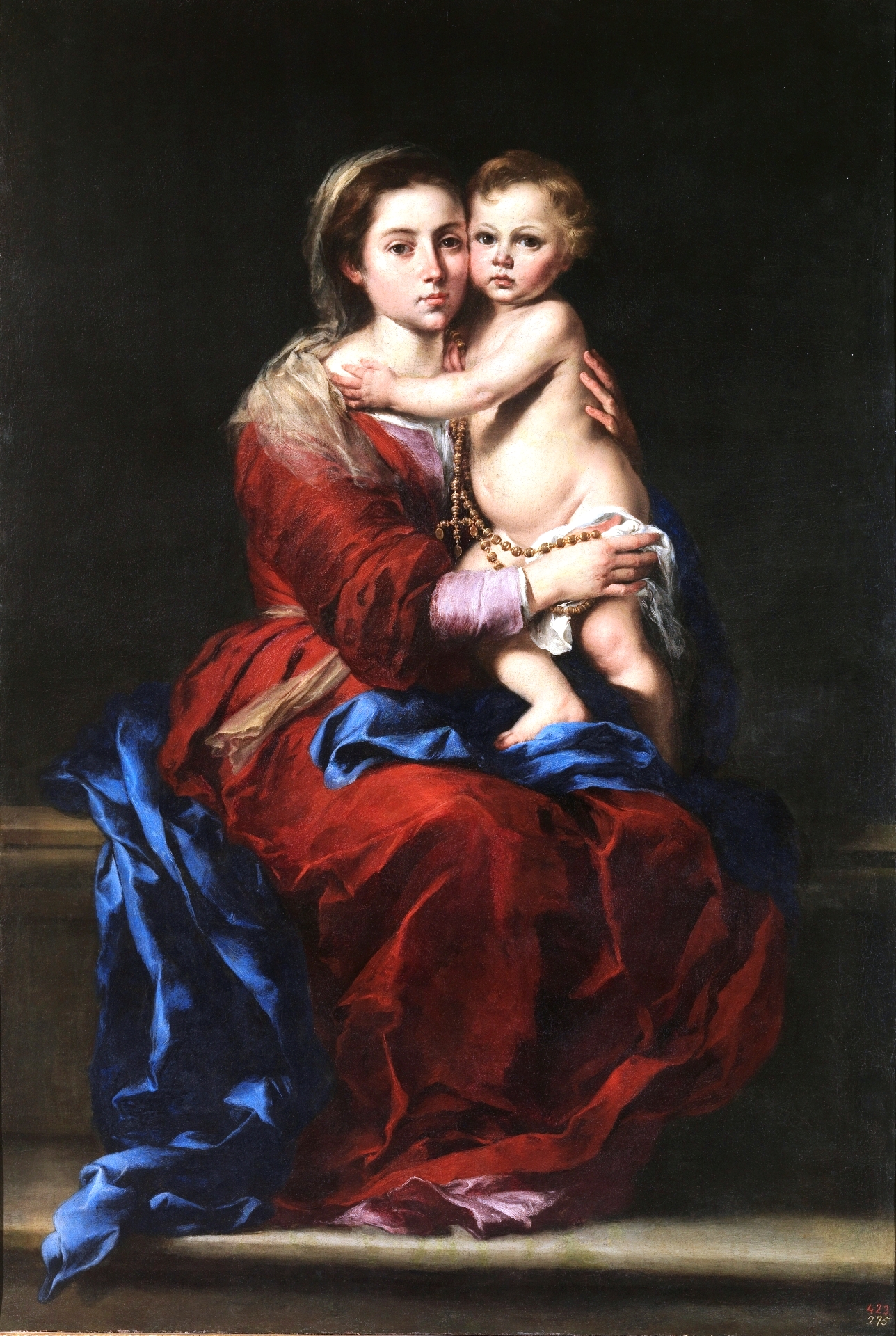
Madonna with the Rosary by Murillo, 1650

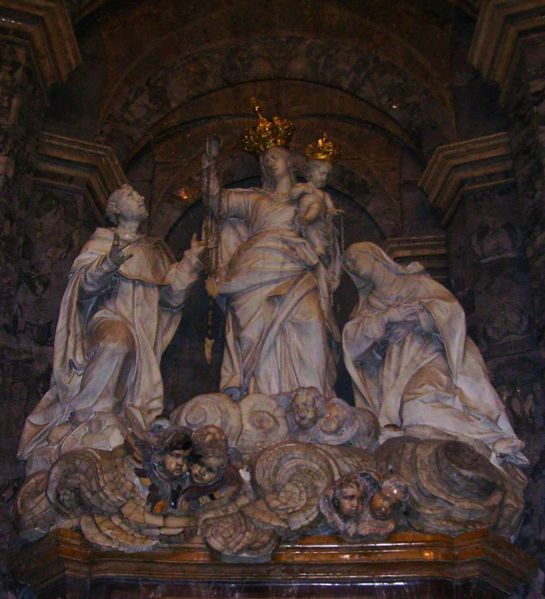
Madonna of the Rosary statue, Naples, Italy

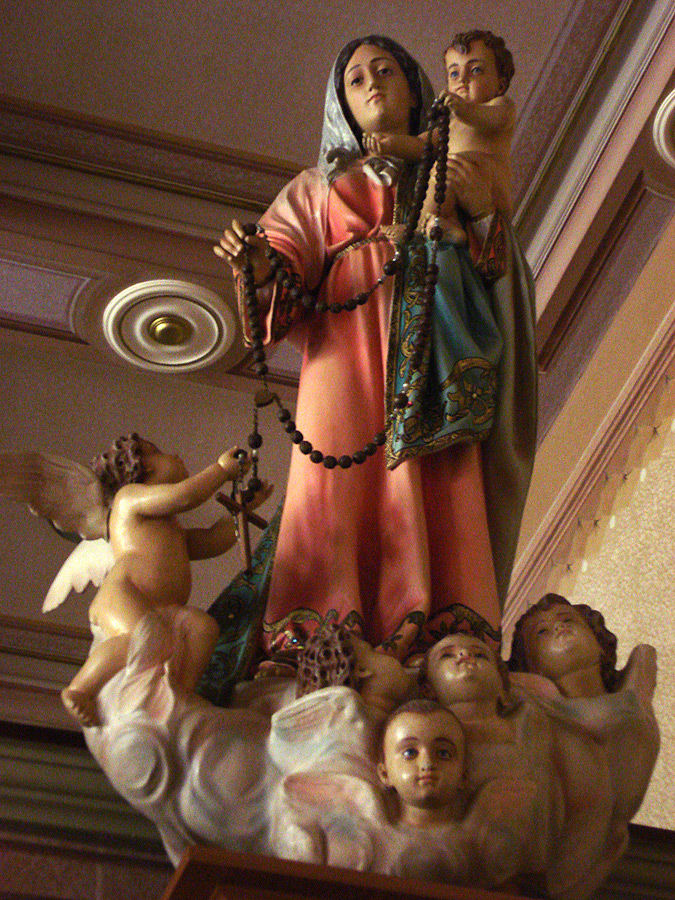
Rosary Madonna, Porto Alegre, Brazil

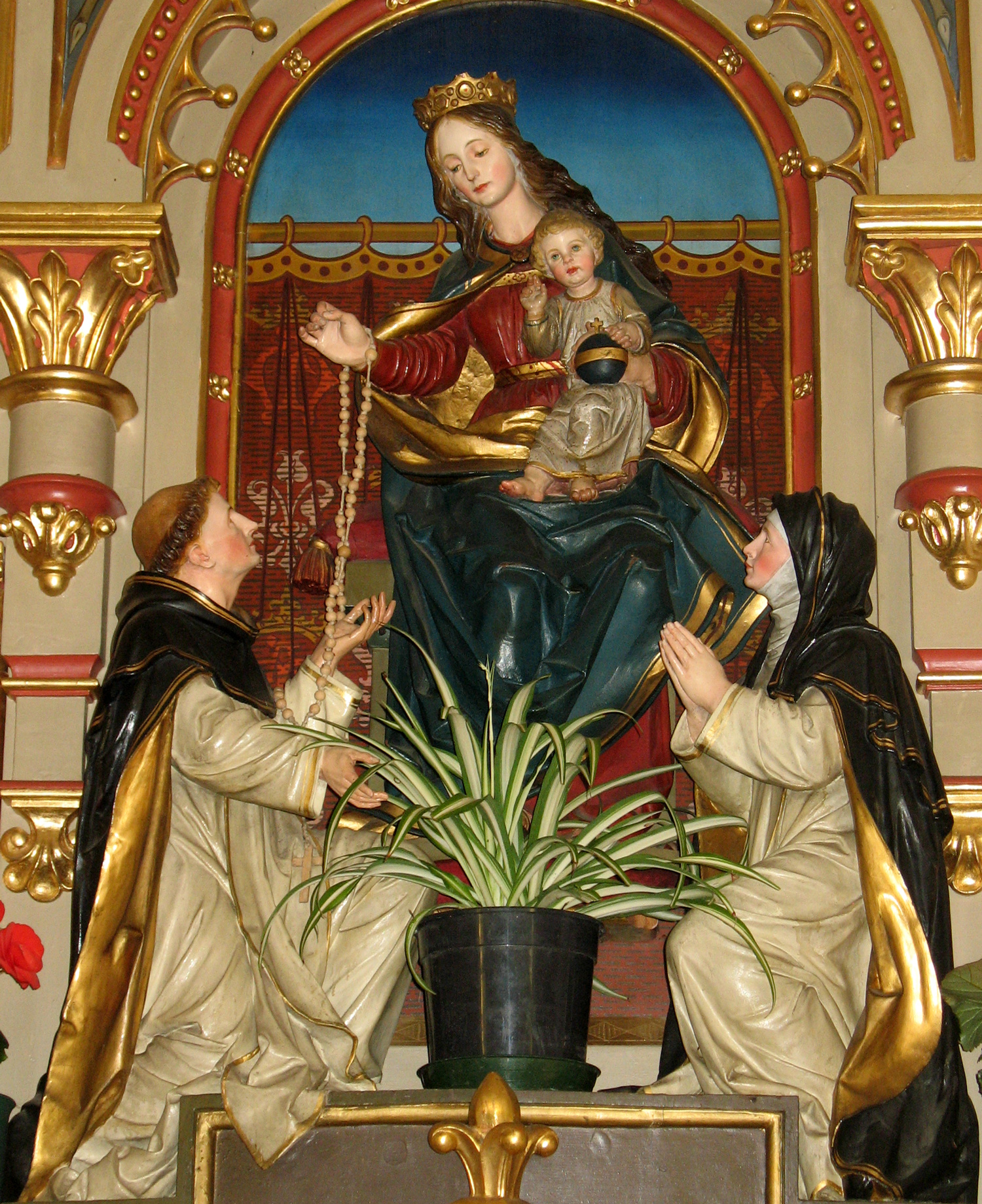
Madonna with Rosary, South-Tyrol, Austria

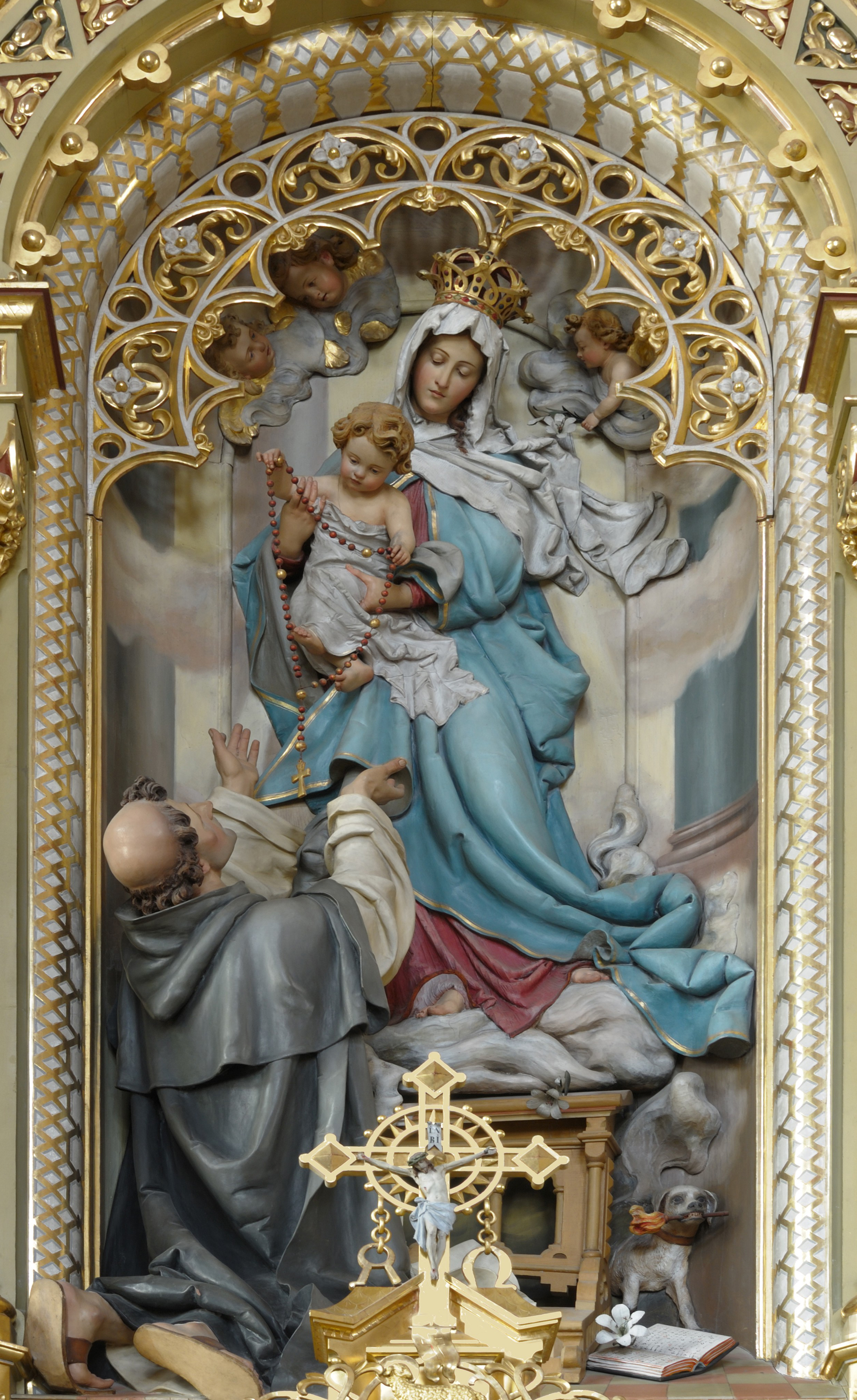
Madonna with Rosary by Josef Mersa, Italy

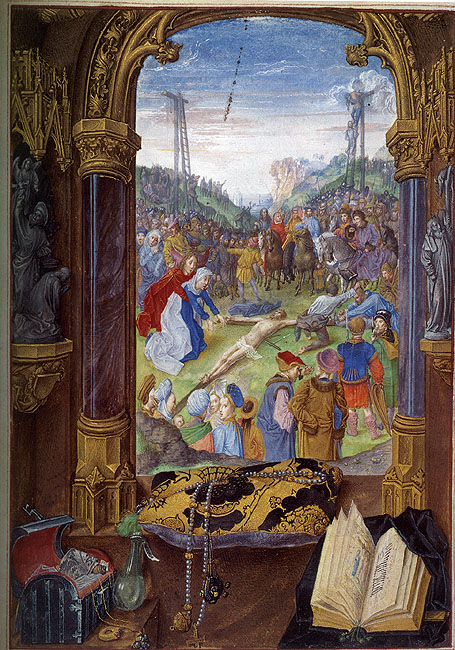
Crucifixion and rosary

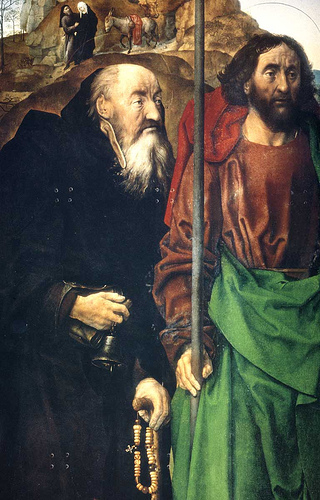
Saint Anthony with a rosary

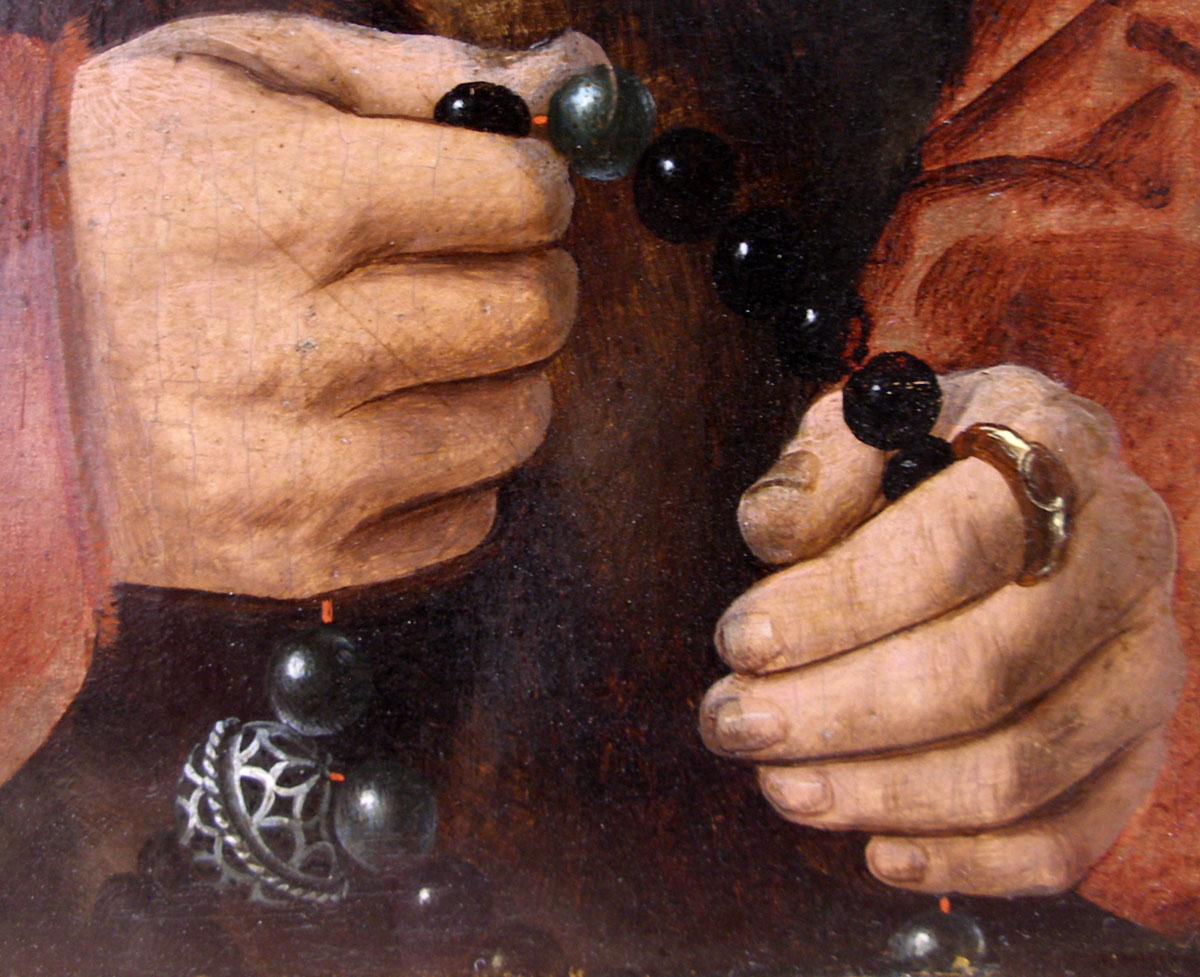
Rosary with pomander

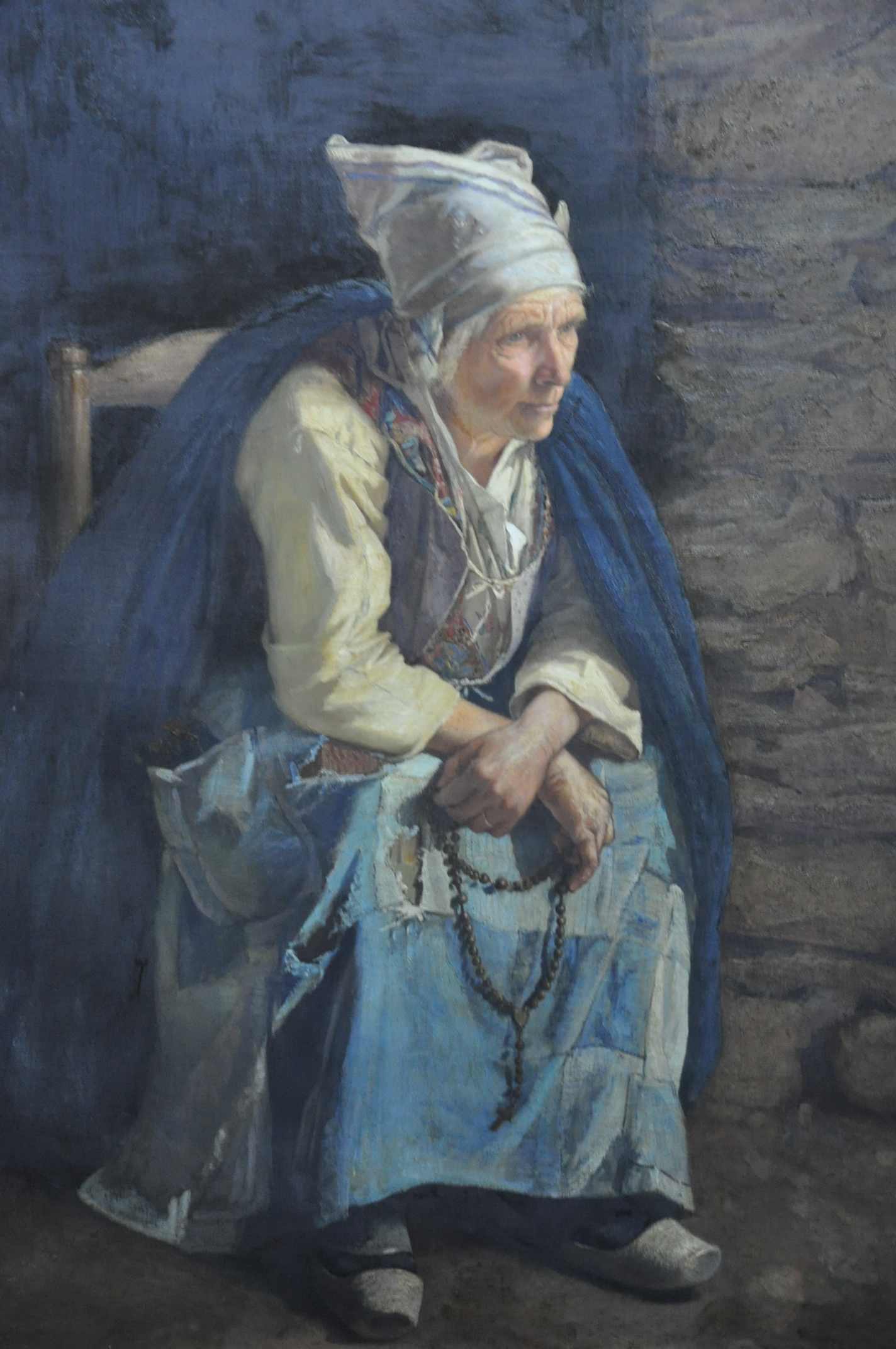
Old woman praying

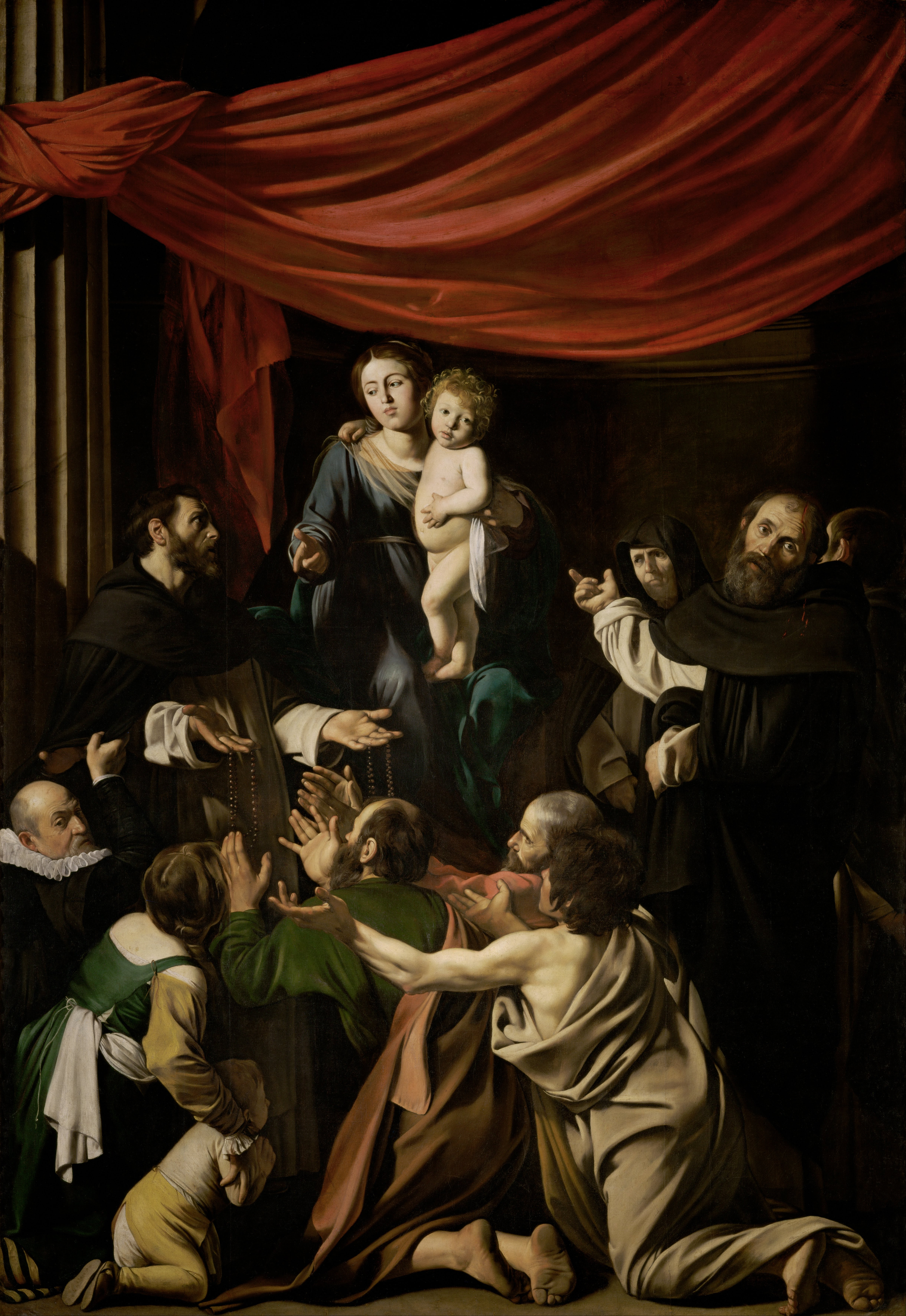
Madonna of the Rosary by Caravaggio

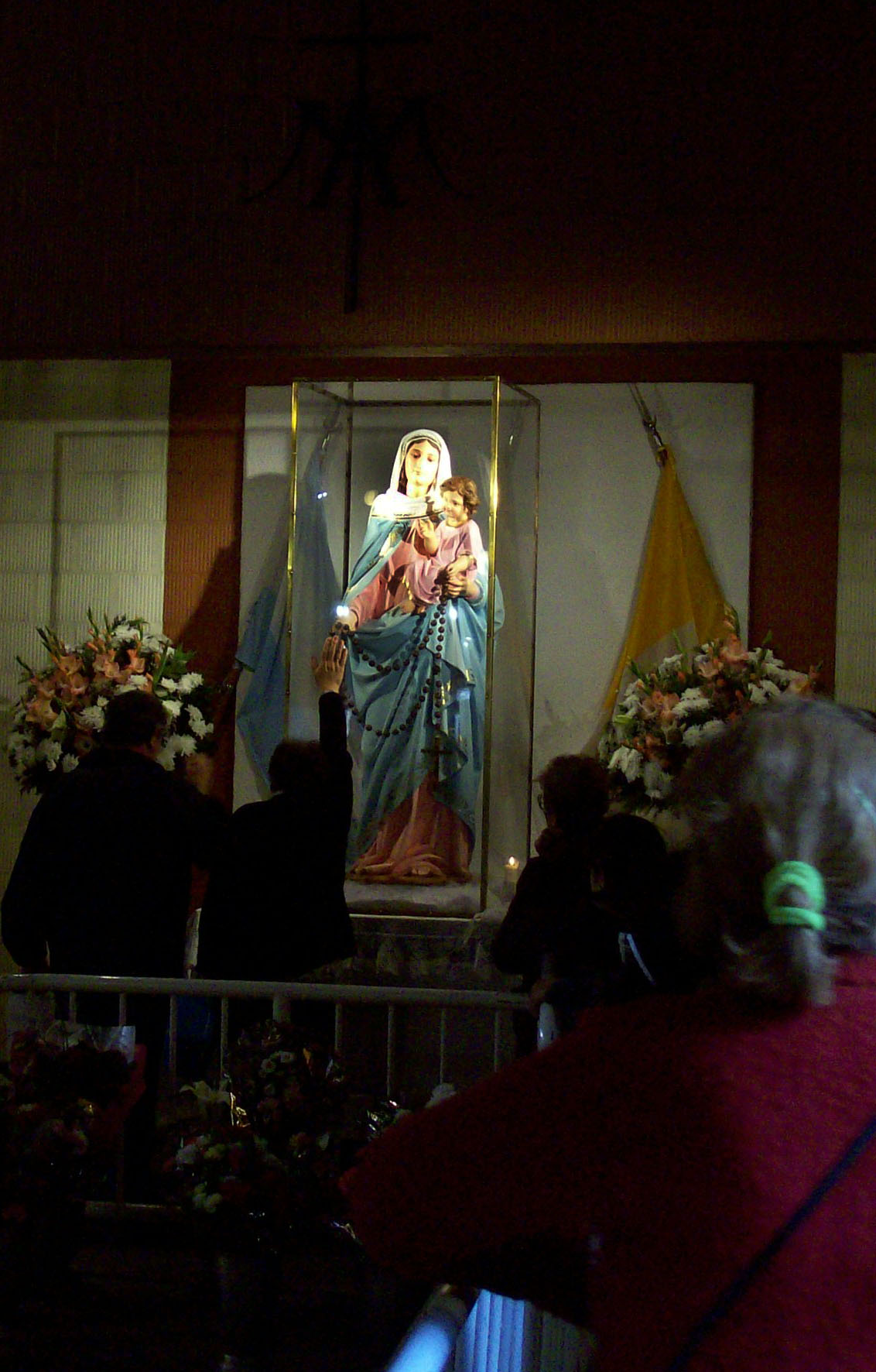

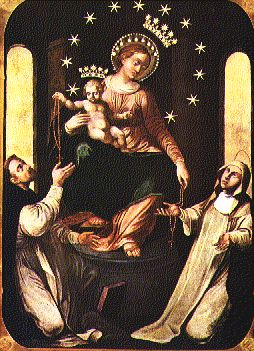

== See also ==
- Lutheran rosary
- Confraternity of the Rosary
- Franciscan Crown
- Japamala
- Misbaha
- Methods of praying the rosary
- Rosary and scapular
- Prayer rope
- Secret of the Rosary
- Papal support
  - Ingruentium malorum (Pope Pius XII)
  - Rosarium Virginis Mariae (Pope John Paul II)
- Prayer beads
- Worry beads
