= Irish penal rosary =

Single-decade religious object and prayer mnemonic

Irish Penal Rosary

The Irish penal rosary (Irish: An Paidrín Beag) was a single-decade rosary used during penal times in Ireland, when Roman Catholicism and its religious objects were forbidden. This version of the rosary is easily hidden, allowing devout Roman Catholics to pray with less fear of being detected.

== Description ==
The crucifix has various symbols of the Passion: a hammer for the nails of the cross; a halo for the Crown of Thorns; a jug symbolizing the Last Supper; cords for binding which recall the Scourging at the Pillar; the spear used at Calvary; a cock and pot, which illustrates an early apocryphal legend relating to Judas the betrayer, and a roasting cock which suddenly came to life and crowed (thus prophesying the Resurrection); and three nails used for the crucifix. Small marks along the side of the corpus indicate a ladder, both for the ladder used in the crucifixion and a metaphor for ascent into heaven.

== Usage ==
The crucifix is hidden inside the sleeve or palm, while the ring is placed over the thumb as the first decade of the rosary is recited. The ring is then placed over the next finger as the next decade is spoken and so on until the five decades are completed.

== See also ==
- Penal laws (Ireland)
- Basque ring rosary, another rosary with 10 beads
- Kombolói, worry beads.
- Prayer beads.
