= Ecumenical Miracle Rosary =

Christian devotion

The Ecumenical Miracle Rosary or "ecumenical rosary" is a set of prayers for ecumenical use associated with the Roman Catholic rosary. The Ecumenical Miracle Rosary presents a core format whose theme is believed by its creator to be central to any Christian denomination.

== Origins of the Ecumenical Miracle Rosary ==
The Ecumenical Miracle Rosary was placed on the web in early 1999, and was intended to bring all Christians together in prayer.

== How the Ecumenical Miracle Rosary is prayed ==
=== "Miracles" ===
The Ecumenical Miracle Rosary uses "miracles", listed below, instead of the mysteries of the traditional rosary. The Ecumenical Miracle Rosary uses:

A. Miraculous Healings (Prayed on Mondays, Thursdays, and Sundays from the first Advent Sunday until the Sunday before Ash Wednesday)

1. Jesus Heals the Centurion's Servant - (Luke 7:1-10 and Matthew 8:5-13)
2. A Woman Touches Jesus' Garments - (Luke 8: 43-48 and Mark 5:25-34 and Matthew 9:20-22)
3. Jesus Heals the Blind Man with Mud - (Mark 8:22-26)
4. Jesus Raises Lazarus from the Dead - (John 11:17-44)
5. Jesus Heals Ten Men with Leprosy - (Luke 17:11-19)

B. Miraculous Acts (Prayed on Tuesdays, Fridays, and the Sundays between Ash Wednesday and Palm Sunday)

1. Jesus Turns Water into Wine (John 2:1-11)
2. Jesus Calms the Storm (Matthew 8:18, 23-27, Mark 4:35-41, and Luke 8:22-25)
3. Jesus Feeds the Five Thousand (Matthew 14:15-21 and Luke 9:12-17 and John 6:4-13 and Mark 6:35-44)
4. Jesus Walks on Water (Mark 6:47-52 and Matthew 14:24-33 and John 6:16-21)
5. The Withered Fig Tree (Mark 11:19-25 and Matthew 21:19-22

C. Miraculous Appearances (Prayed on Wednesdays, Saturdays, and Sundays from Easter until the Sunday before the first Advent Sunday)

1. Jesus Becomes Incarnate by the Holy Spirit from the Virgin Mary (Annunciation) (Luke 1:26-56)
2. Transfiguration (Matthew 17:1-9 and Luke 9:28-36 and Mark 9:2-10)
3. Jesus Appears to Mary Magdalene (John 20:11-18 and Mark 16:9-11)
4. Jesus Appears to Doubting Thomas (John 20:26-31)
5. Jesus Appears to Paul (Acts 9:1-19)

=== Prayers ===
Its prayers are different from the traditional rosary. They use the Nicene Creed rather than the Apostles Creed, "The Greatest Commandment" (see below) rather than the Hail Mary, and "The Great Commission" (see below) rather than the Glory Be. It ends with the Jesus Prayer.

==== The Greatest Commandment ====
"Sweet Jesus, I love you with all my heart and all my soul, Help me to serve my family, and everyone else I meet today."

This prayer attempts to capture what is written in scripture concerning Jesus' Greatest Commandment. It can be found in Matthew 22:34-40.

==== The Great Commission ====
"Oh my lord, I know that you are always with me, help me to obey your commandments. And lead me to share my faith with others, so that they may know you and love you."

This prayer attempts to capture what is written in scripture concerning the Great Commission. It can be found in Matthew 28:16-20.

==== The Jesus Prayer ====
"Lord Jesus Christ, Son of God; have mercy upon me, a sinner."

In addition, free brochures which describe how to pray the Ecumenical Miracle Rosary can be obtained from its website.

== Reactions to the Ecumenical Miracle Rosary ==
Since the devotion's inception in 1999, many Catholics and Protestants have responded favorably to the Ecumenical Miracle Rosary; for example, many churches have held Ecumenical Rosary prayer sessions where the devotion has been prayed. These include: Roman Catholic, Lutheran, Anglican, Methodist and Baptist churches. In addition, the official website hosts free conference calls during Advent, Lent and Kingdomtide, where participants pray the Ecumenical Miracle Rosary.
