= Basque ring rosary =

Catholic prayer aid

A Basque ring rosary (in Basque : Euskal arrosarioa) is a typical Basque rosary.

== Traditional Basque rosary ==
The rosary is a circular wooden piece, 4 cm in diameter with a hole in the middle to introduce a finger. Like all rosaries, its aim is to enable a faithful of the Catholic Church to count the number of recited prayers.

At the top is a cross (typically with 4 branches of the same size) symbolizing the prayer Our Father. On the periphery, 10 small spheres equally distributed symbolize the Hail Mary.

The user places a finger in the opening at the center and puts his thumb on the cross at the top. They recite an Our Father, then moves their thumb onto the first small sphere. They recite as many Hail Marys as they wish, advancing one bead after each prayer.

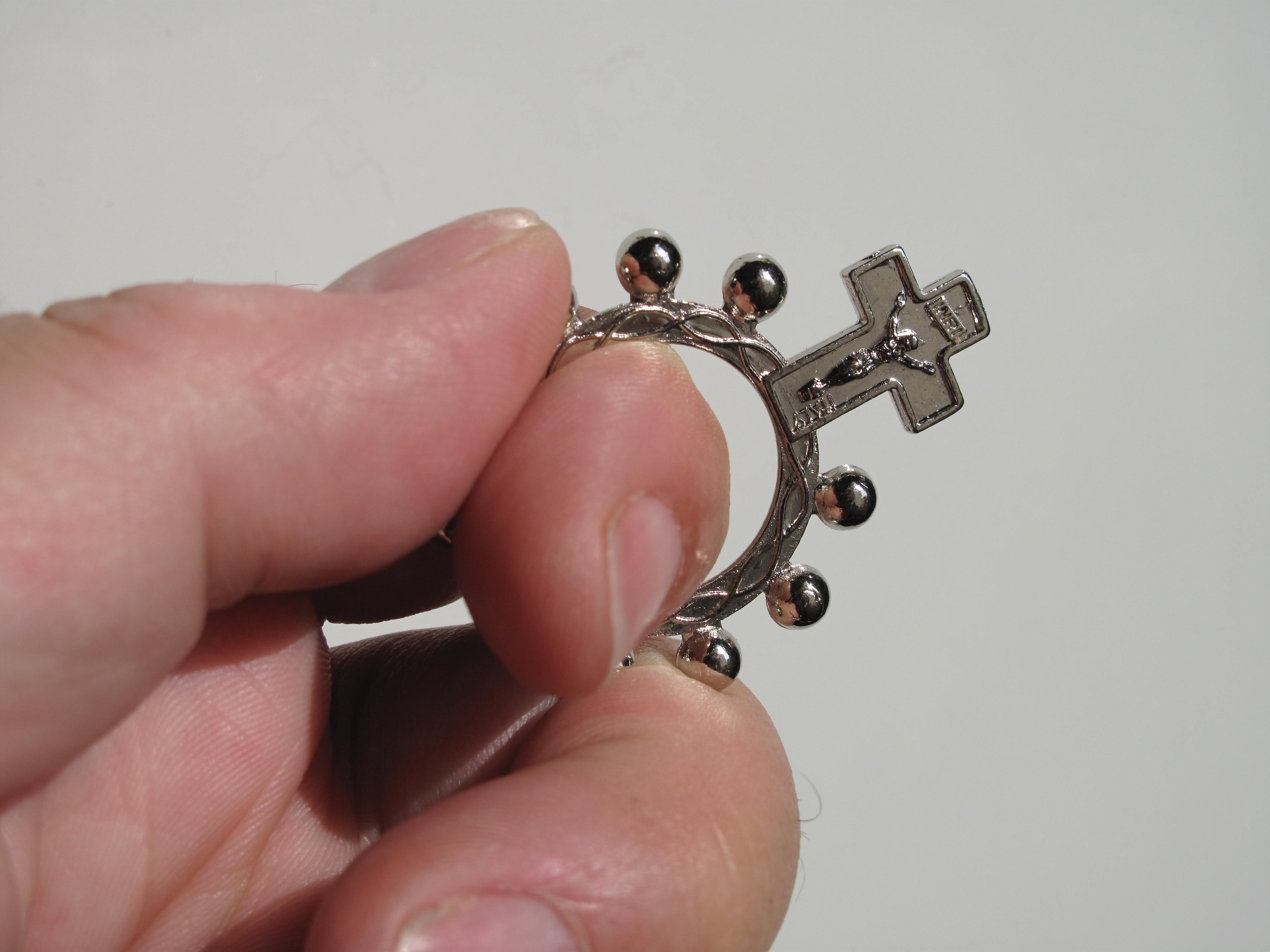

== Basque rosary in jewelry ==
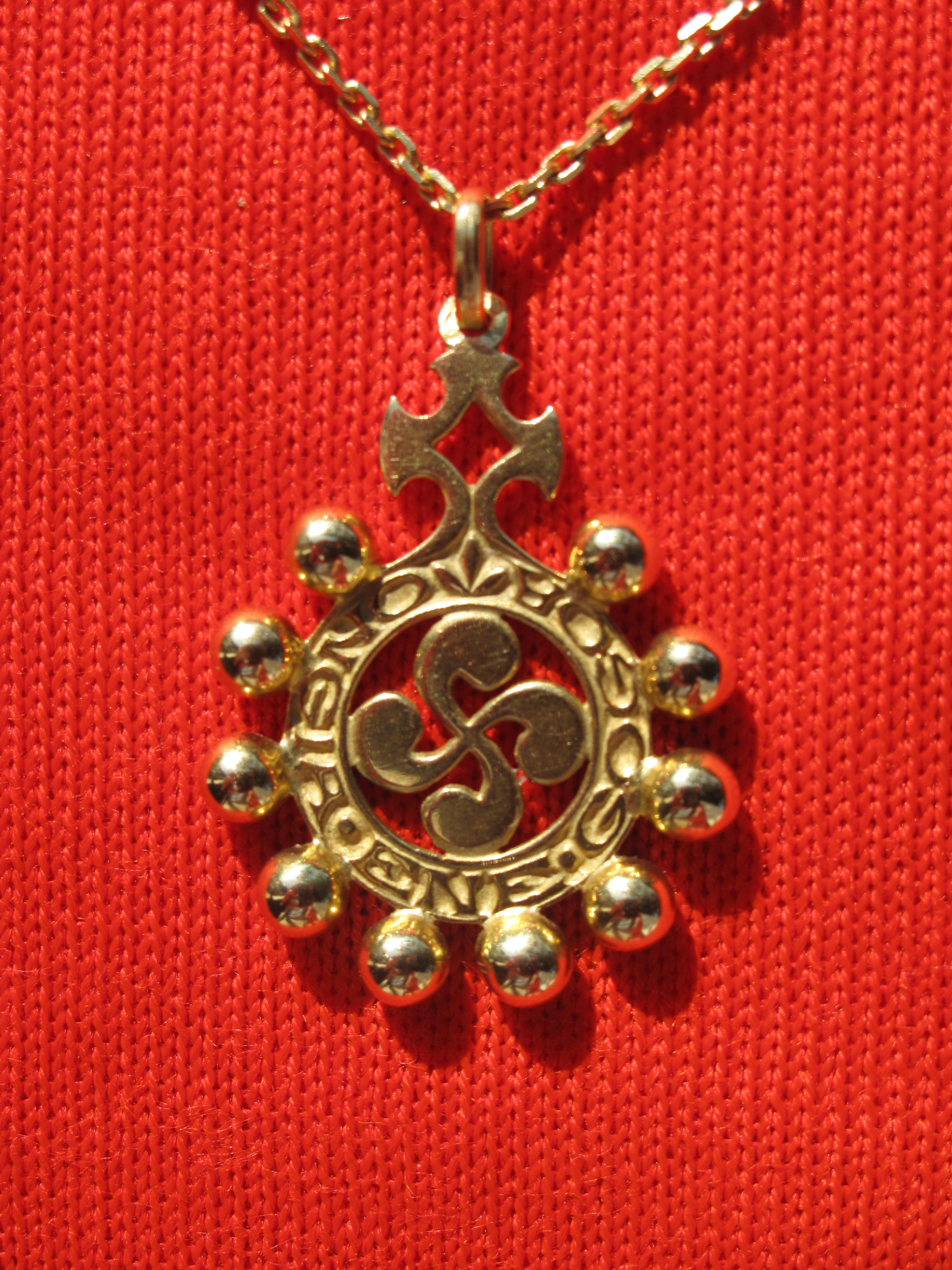
Basque Rosary jewel.

The Basque rosary is a simple piece of jewelry, gold or silver, 1 to 4 cm diameter. Worn with a little chain around the neck. The central opening is then often replaced by a little figure like the Basque cross Lauburu. It is sometimes adorned with a slogan such as Ongi ene gogoa (= "[Doing] good [is] my wish/mind").

== Other ring rosaries ==
Other cultures have also used ring rosaries, especially in cases of religious persecutions against Catholics. An example is the Irish penal rosary. Rosary rings are also sometimes given to Catholic nuns at the time of their solemn profession.
