= Calamus jenkinsianus =

Scientific classification
- Kingdom: Plantae
- Clade: Tracheophytes
- Clade: Angiosperms
- Clade: Monocots
- Clade: Commelinids
- Order: Arecales
- Family: Arecaceae
- Subfamily: Calamoideae
- Tribe: Calameae
- Genus: Calamus
- Species: C. jenkinsianus

Binomial name
- Calamus jenkinsianus Griff.

Synonyms
- Daemonorops jenkinsiana (Griff.) Mart.; Daemonorops nutantiflora (Griff.) Mart.; Daemonorops margaritae (Hance) Becc.; Daemonorops pierreana Becc.; Daemonorops schmidtiana Becc.; Calamus jenkinsianus tenasserimica; Calamus nutantiflorus Griff.; Calamus margaritae Hance; Palmijuncus nutantiflorus (Griff.) Kuntze; Palmijuncus margaritae (Hance) Kuntze; Palmijuncus jenkinsianus (Griff.) Kuntze

Species of flowering plant

Calamus jenkinsianus is an Asian species of rattan in the family Arecaceae and the tribe Calameae; it is widely known under its synonym Daemonorops jenkinsiana. It has been recorded from: Assam, Bangladesh, Cambodia, China Southeast, East Himalaya, Hainan, Laos, Myanmar, Taiwan, Thailand and Vietnam, (where it is called mây rút).

== Uses ==
The seeds of species such as C. jenkinsianus (Chinese: 星月菩提) are harvested for the production of Buddhist prayer beads.

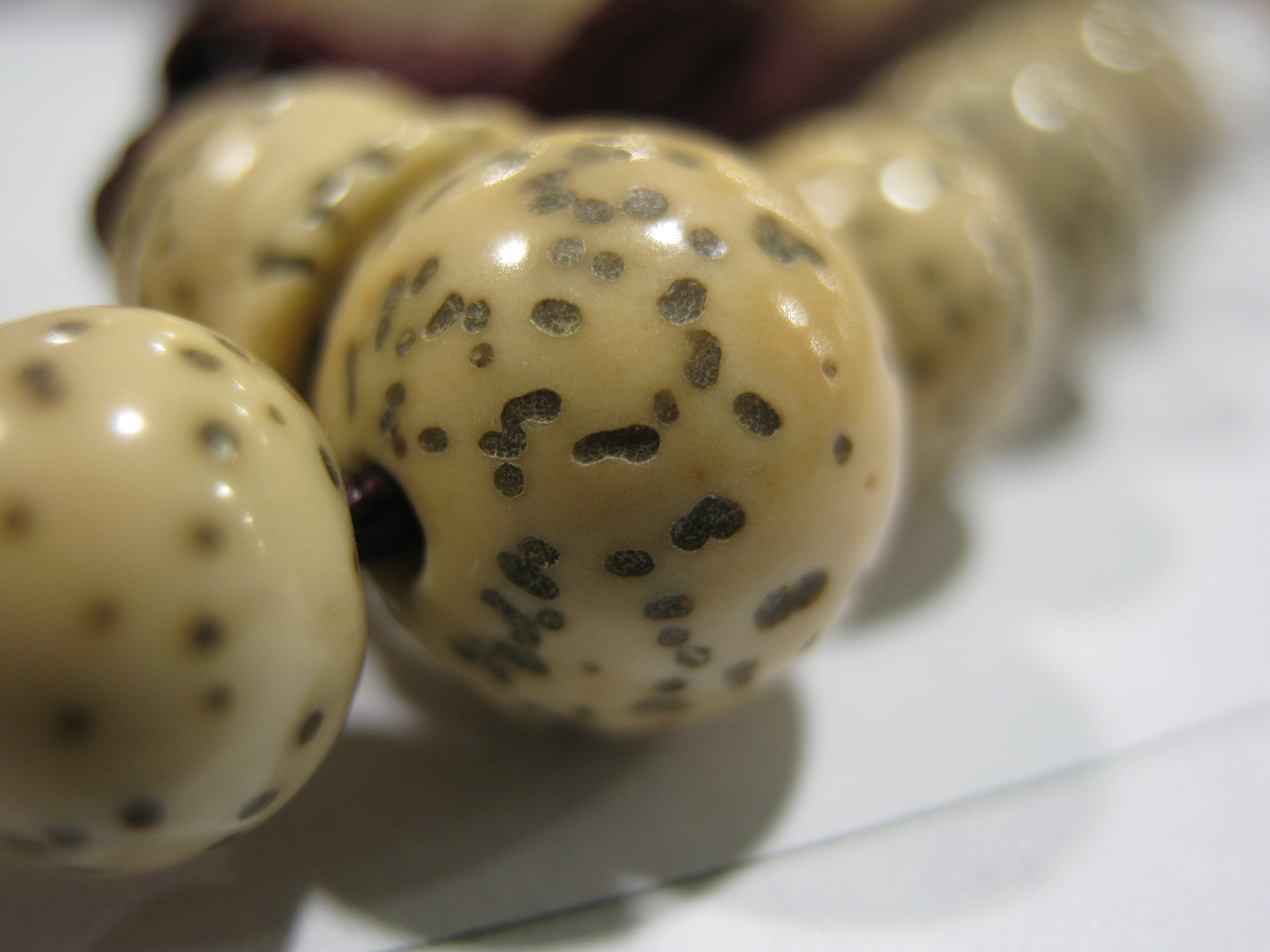
Polished seeds on a mala
