= Ziziphus budhensis =

Scientific classification
- Kingdom: Plantae
- Clade: Tracheophytes
- Clade: Angiosperms
- Clade: Eudicots
- Clade: Rosids
- Order: Rosales
- Family: Rhamnaceae
- Genus: Ziziphus
- Species: Z. budhensis

Binomial name
- Ziziphus budhensis Bhattarai & M.L.Pathak

Species of tree

Ziziphus budhensis is a species of plant in the family Rhamnaceae, endemic to the Temal region of Bagmati Province, Nepal.

== Description ==
The tree grows to be eight to ten meters tall. It is dimorphic. The sterile branches have longer spines, and the fertile branches have shorter spines or no spines. The alternate leaves are ovate and elliptic. It has white flowers in March and April. It fruits in May through August.

== Economic and religious value ==
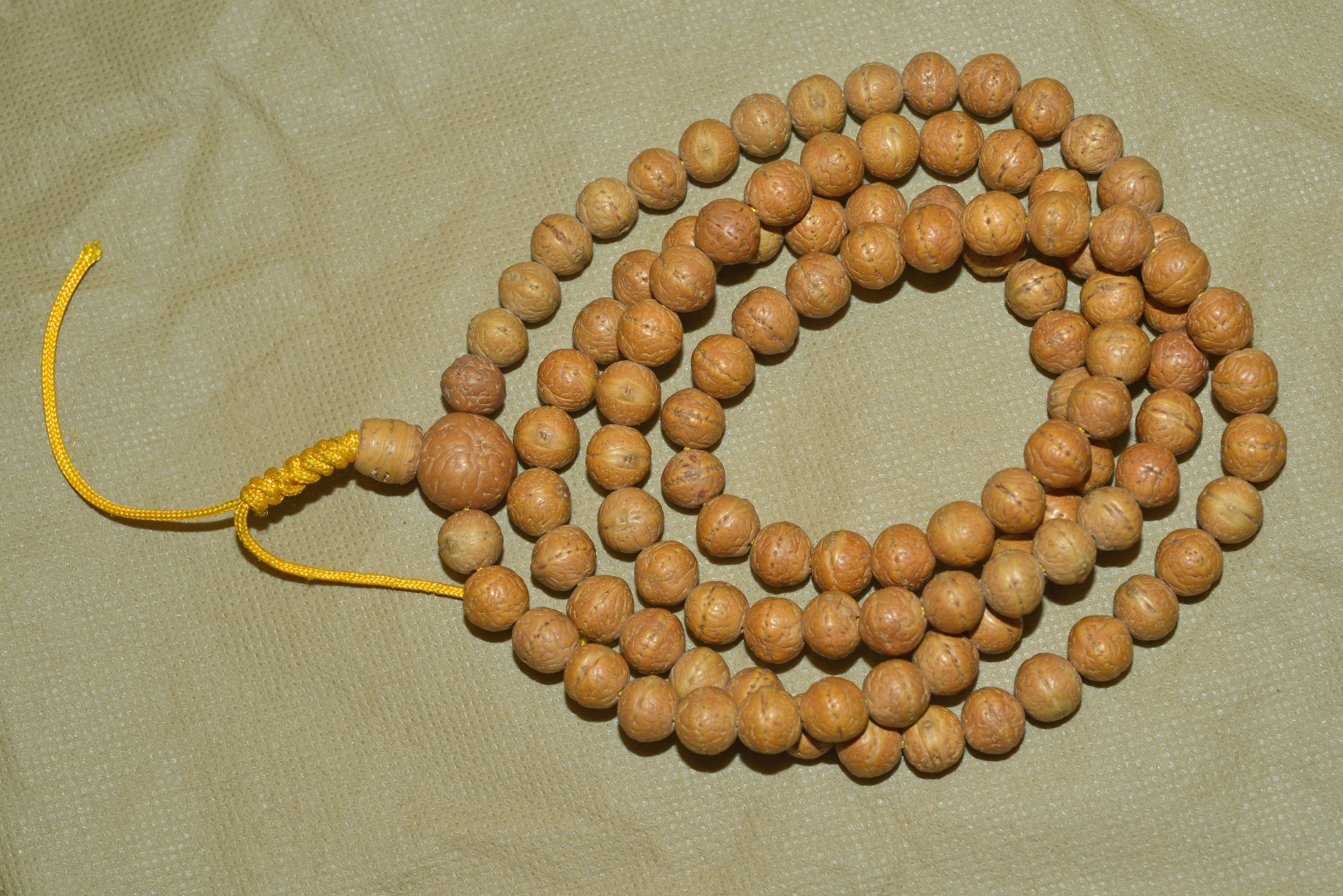
A Bodichitta mala of Ziziphus budhensis seeds

A wrist mala of Ziziphus budhensis seeds with a guru bead and tassel

Ziziphus budhensis has an edible fruit and the tree is also used as cattle fodder. The seeds are used as beads to make malas (rosaries), known as Bodhichitta malas, Buddha chitta mala, or Bodhi seed malas, used in Tibetan Buddhist worship. These are highly valued with a mala of 108 beads costing up to 80 thousand Nepalese Rupees. However the price of the mala varies according to the diameter and the face of the seed. Smaller the diameter bulkier is the price. Similarly mala with one face is most expensive followed by five faced, four faced, three faced, 2 faced and so on. Reportedly the Timal region boasts an annual Buddhachitta trade worth one billion Nepali rupees ($9.8 million) and the beads are being exported from Nepal to India, China, Singapore, Japan, and Korea. The Government of Nepal's Ministry of Forestry has established a committee and has begun to distribute the seedling of the plant so as to uplift the economic status of the people living in this area. Numbers of nurseries have been established raising the seedling of it. The price of the seedling varies according to the date of germination and the face of the seed.
