= Japamala =

Indian prayer bead string

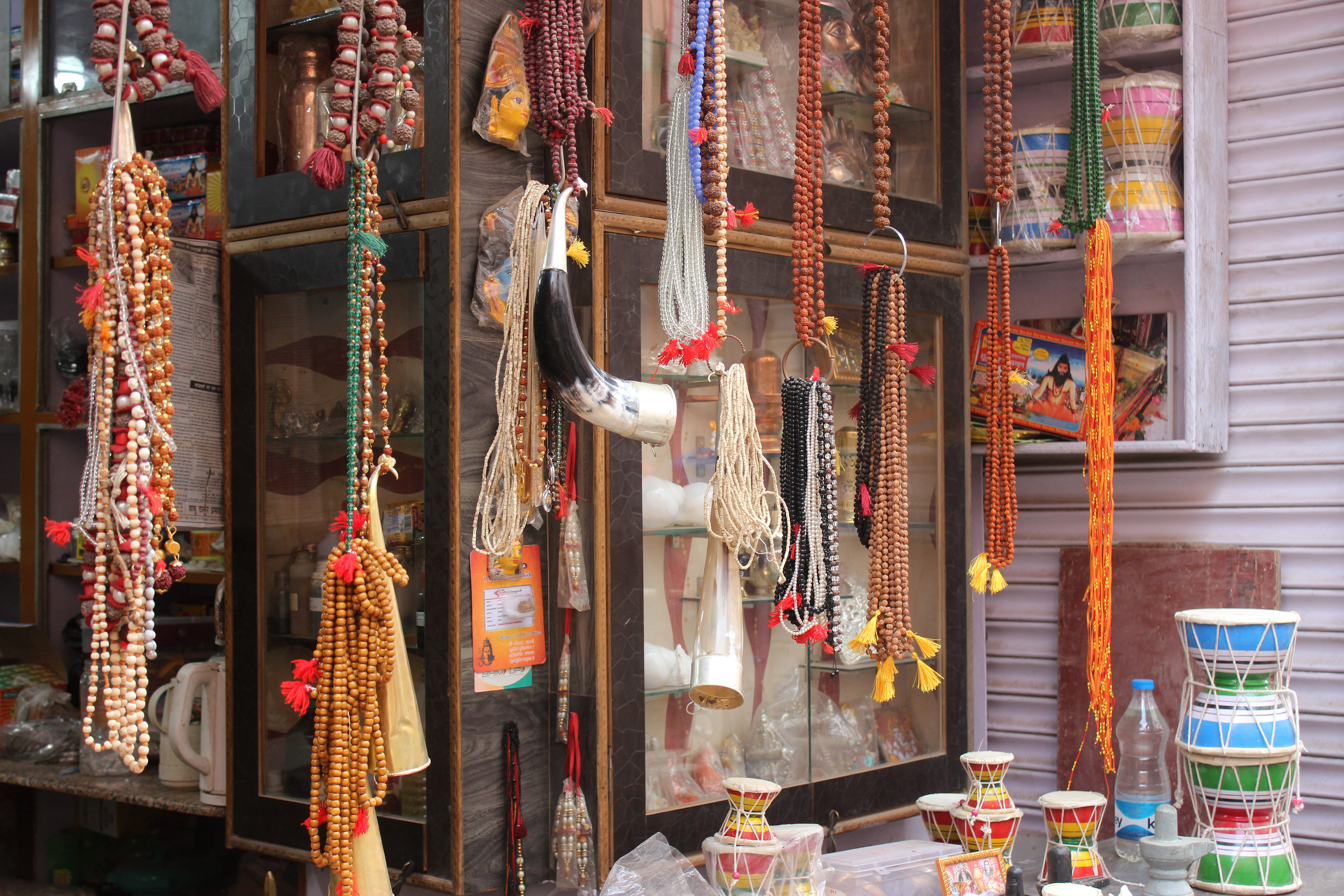
- Different types of japamala (prayer beads) selling in Varanasi, India

Chinese name
- Chinese: 佛珠
- Literal meaning: "Buddha pearls"
Transcriptions
Standard Mandarin
- Hanyu Pinyin: Fózhū
- Gwoyeu Romatzyh: Forju
- Wade–Giles: Fo^{2}-chu^{1}
- IPA: [fwǒ.ʈʂú]
Yue: Cantonese
- Yale Romanization: faht-jyū
- Jyutping: Fat^{6}-zyu^{1}
Southern Min
- Tâi-lô: Hu̍t-tsu

Japanese name
- Kanji: 念珠, 数珠
Transcriptions
- Romanization: nenju ("reciting beads"), juzu ("counting beads")

Sanskrit name
- Sanskrit: mālā (माला)

A japamala, jaap maala, or simply mala (Sanskrit: माला; mālā, meaning 'garland') is a loop of prayer beads commonly used in Indian religions such as Hinduism, Buddhism, Jainism and Sikhism. It is used for counting recitations (japa) of mantras, prayers or other sacred phrases. It is also worn to ward off evil, to count repetitions within some other form of sadhana (spiritual practice) such as prostrations before a holy icon. They are also used as symbols of religious identification.

The main body of a mala usually consists of 108 beads of roughly the same size and material as each other, although smaller versions, often factors of 108 such as 54 or 27, exist. A distinctive 109th "guru bead" or mother bead, which is not counted, is very common.

Mala beads have traditionally been made of a variety of materials such as wood, stone, gems, seeds, bone and precious metals—with various religions often favouring certain materials—and strung with natural fibres such as cotton, silk, or animal hair. In the modern era, synthetic materials can also be used, such as plastic or glass beads, and nylon cords. Malas are similar to other forms of prayer beads used in various world religions, such as the misbaha in Islam and the rosary in Christianity.

== History ==
=== Origin ===
The specific origin of the mala is unknown, with the use of beads for counting being a widespread practice among ancient cultures. No references to malas appear in Chinese literature before the introduction of Buddhism during the Han dynasty, suggesting that the practice may have originated in India before spreading to China. No mention of a mala occurs in the Buddhist Agamas or Pali Nikayas, generally regarded as the oldest Buddhist literature. It is therefore unclear whether the use of malas originated among Buddhists or among Brahmins, Jains, or another Indian religious community.

=== Early attestations ===
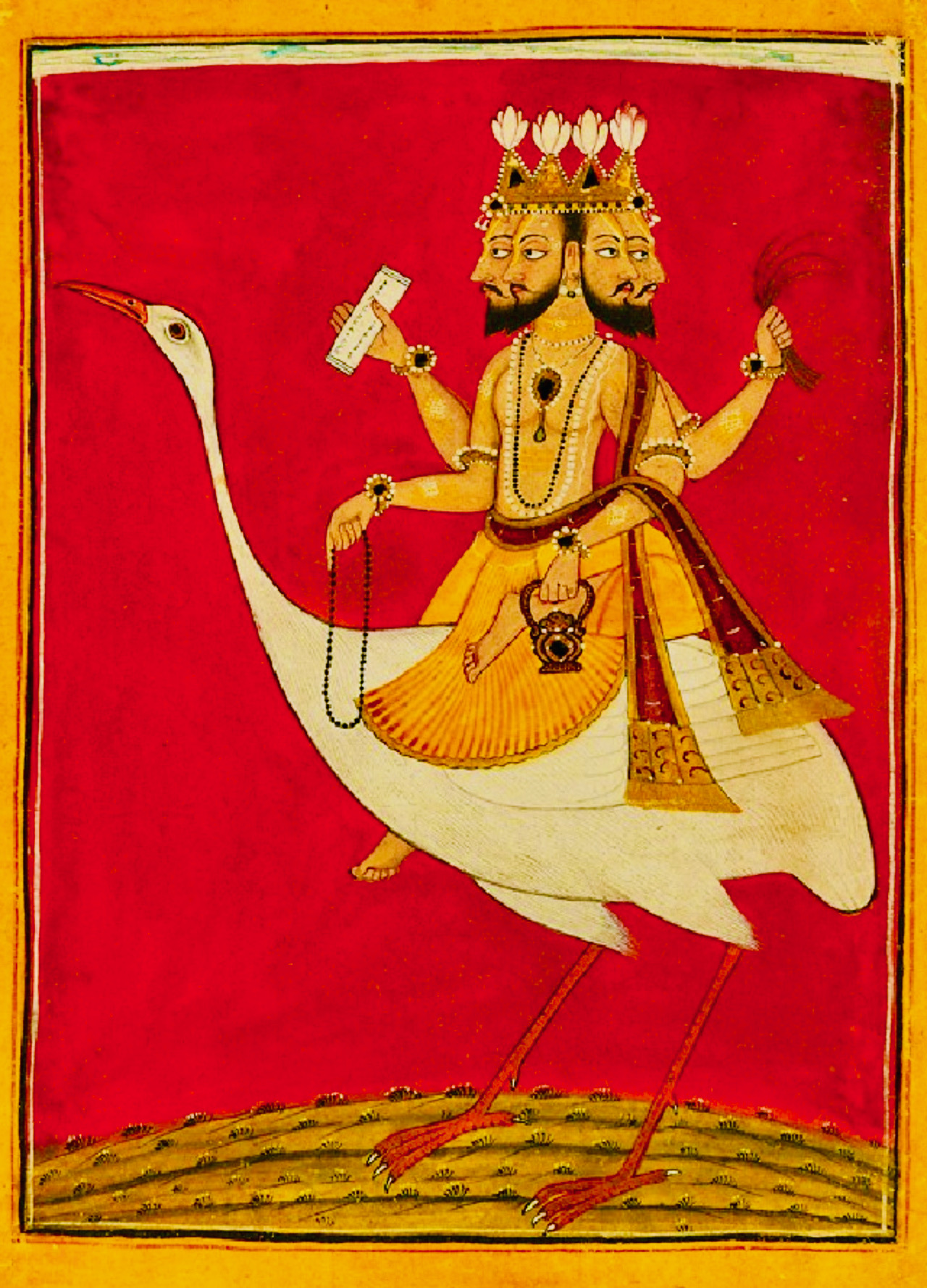
The Hindu god Brahma is shown depicted with a japamala in his hand.

Malas may appear in early Hindu art as part of the garb of deities or worshippers, but are difficult to distinguish from decorative necklaces or garlands. The earliest clear depiction of a mala being used as a tool for recitation, rather than as a (possible) decorative necklace, comes from a bodhisattva image created during the Northern Wei dynasty (4th - 6th century) in China; the mala is held in the hand, rather than worn.

The first literary reference to the use of a mala for the recitation of mantras comes from the Mu Huanzi Jing (木槵子經 or 佛說木槵子經, "Aristaka/Soap-Berry Seed Scripture/Classic", Taishō Tripiṭaka volume 17, number 786), a Mahayana Buddhist text purported to have been translated into Chinese during the Eastern Jin era, sometime in the 4th - 5th century CE.

No mention of this text occurs in standard bibliographies before the 6th century, but an independent translation in the 8th century suggests an origin as a Sanskrit text transmitted from Central Asia, rather than a Chinese composition. According to this text, a king asks the Buddha for "an essential method that will allow me during the day or night to engage easily in a practice for freeing us from all sufferings in the world in the future." The Buddha instructs the king to make a mala from the seeds of a soapberry tree (likely the aristaka, the Indian soapberry tree) and recite an homage to the three jewels while passing the mala through his fingers. The text also states the mala should be worn at all times, and that if a million recitations were completed, the king would end the one hundred and eight passions.

Another Mahayana Buddhist source which teaches the use of a mala is found in the Chinese canon in The Sutra on the Yoga Rosaries of the Diamond Peak (金剛頂瑜伽念珠経, Ch.: Chin-kang-ting yü-ch’ieh nien-chu ch’ing, Taisho 789) which was translated by the Buddhist vajracarya Amoghavajra (705–774). The text states that the mala should be worn around the neck and that this purifies bad karma.

Rudraksha japamalas are discussed in some Hindu sources, such as in the Devi-Bhagavata Purana (9th-14th century) which explains how to make a rudraksha garland, and in the Rudrakṣajābāla upaniṣad. The Rudrakṣajābāla upaniṣad states that the rudrakshas are tears of Shiva, and as such, they should always be worn by devotees of Shiva. It discusses various ways of wearing them, and which mantras to use with them.

Regarding Vaishnava sources, the Garuda Purana and the Padma Purana both teach the use and wear of a mala made from tulasi wood (tulasi kanthi mala). The Garuda Purana explains that by wearing this mala, Hari (Vishnu) will always be with the devotee. It also states that wearing a tulasi mala will multiply the benefit of doing good karmic deeds, as well as providing magical protection from harm. The Padma Purana says one should always wear the tulasi mala, whether one is pure or impure, even while bathing, eating or going to the toilet.

=== China ===
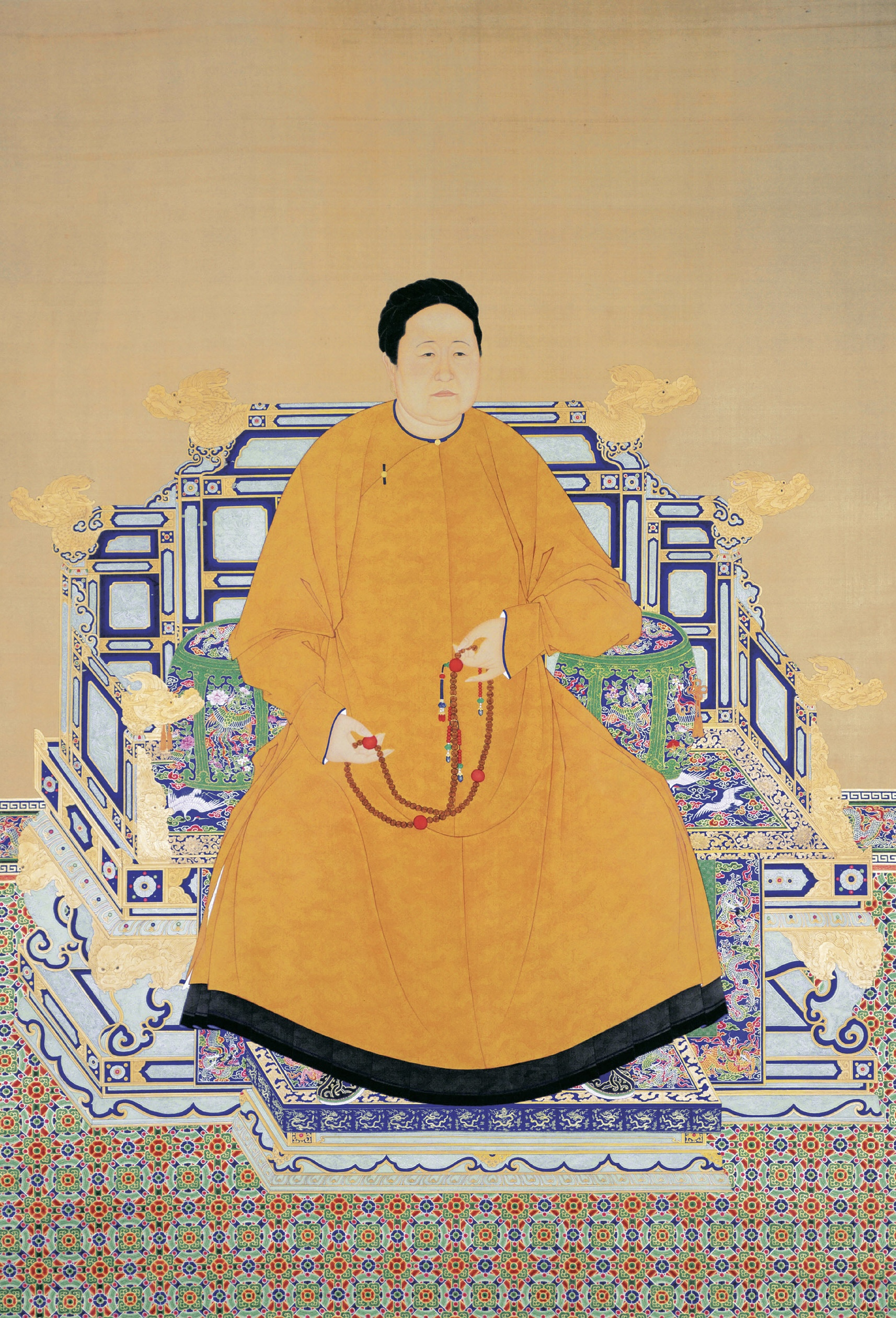
The official imperial portrait of Qing dynasty Empress Xiaozhuangwen with a mala

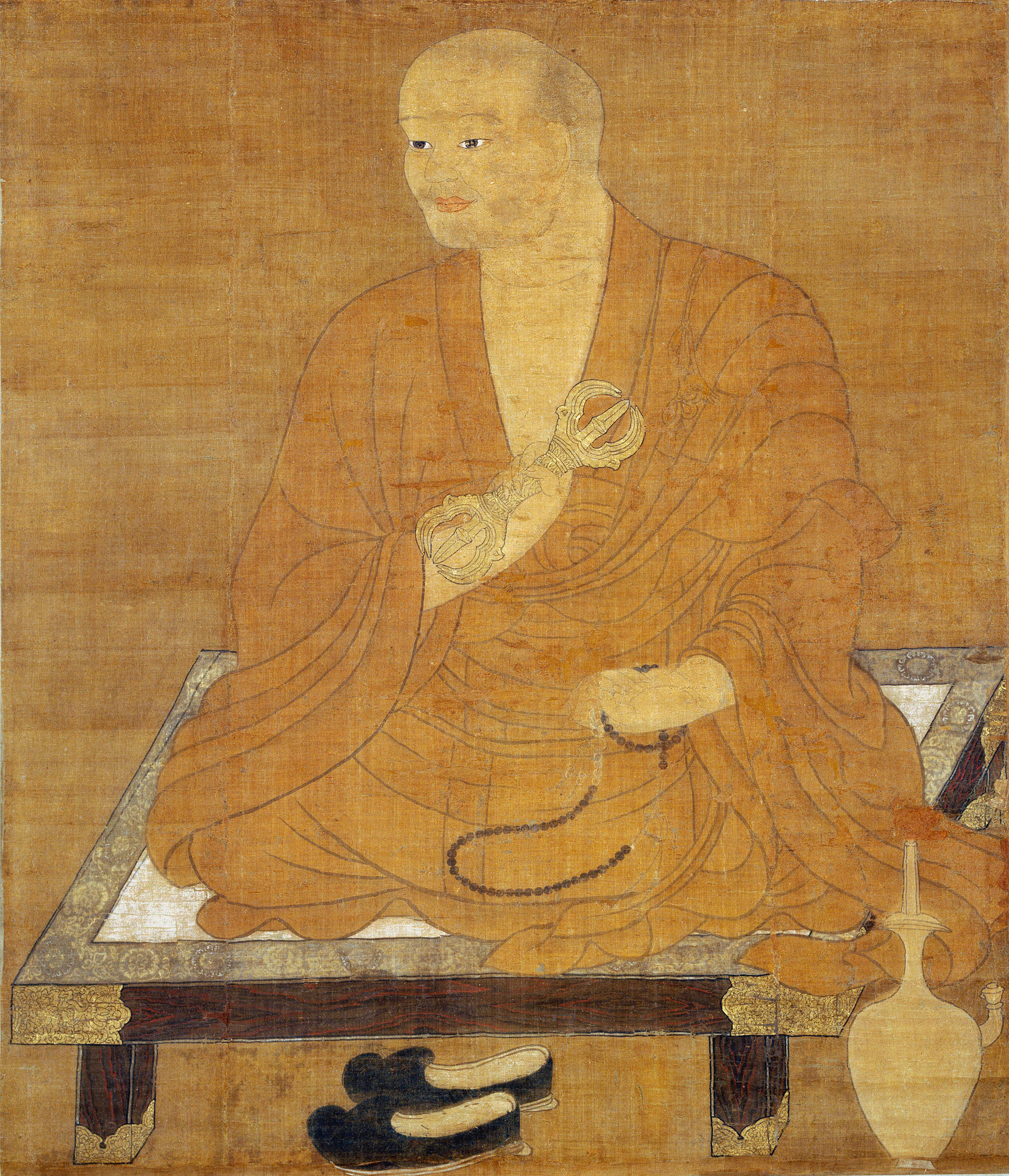
Kūkai (774–835), founder of Japanese Shingon, who brought some malas back to Japan from China.

While the earliest Buddhist story about the mala is associated with lay practice, in China it was initially primarily associated with monastic practice. The first Chinese Buddhist author to promote the use of malas was the Pure Land patriarch Daochuo (562–645). Images of monks with malas began to appear in China in the 7th century CE and the mala seems to have been regarded as a common piece of monastic equipment by around this era. While there are relatively few pre-Song dynasty depictions or references to the mala, this may be due to its use in private religious practice rather than public ceremony. Chinese authors criticized monks who recited mantras on their malas in public, as monks were generally expected to remain silent while on public alms rounds.

By the Ming dynasty-era, malas increasingly began to be valued for their aesthetic qualities as much or more than their spiritual use and were often worn by royals and high officials. Malas of expensive or rare materials became common as gifts given among the wealthy, and the materials allowed to different grades of wives and concubines was regulated by sumptuary laws. Depictions of Qing dynasty court officials often include malas, intended to show their status and wealth rather than as an indication of spirituality.

== Materials ==
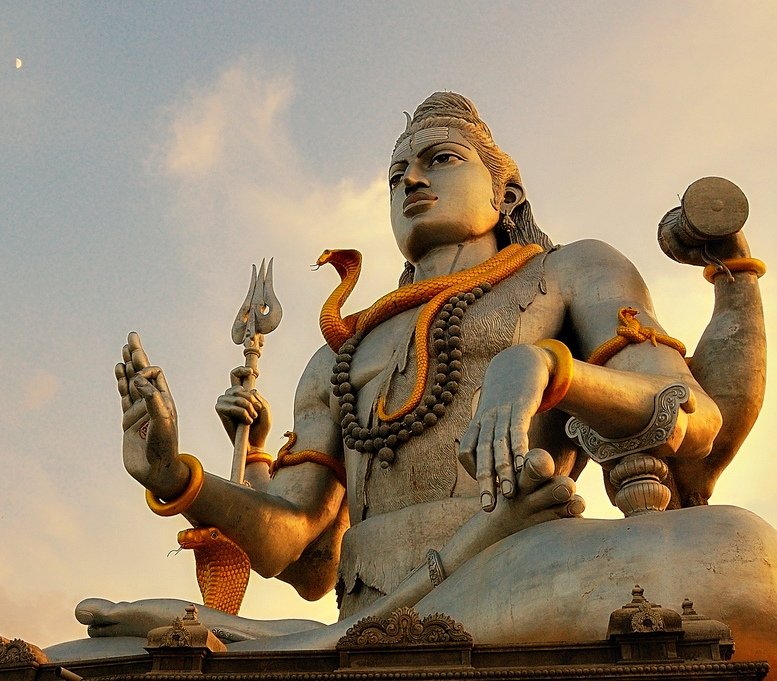
Statue of Shiva at Murudeshwara; Shiva is frequently depicted wearing a pair of rudraksha malas in Shaiva Hindu iconography

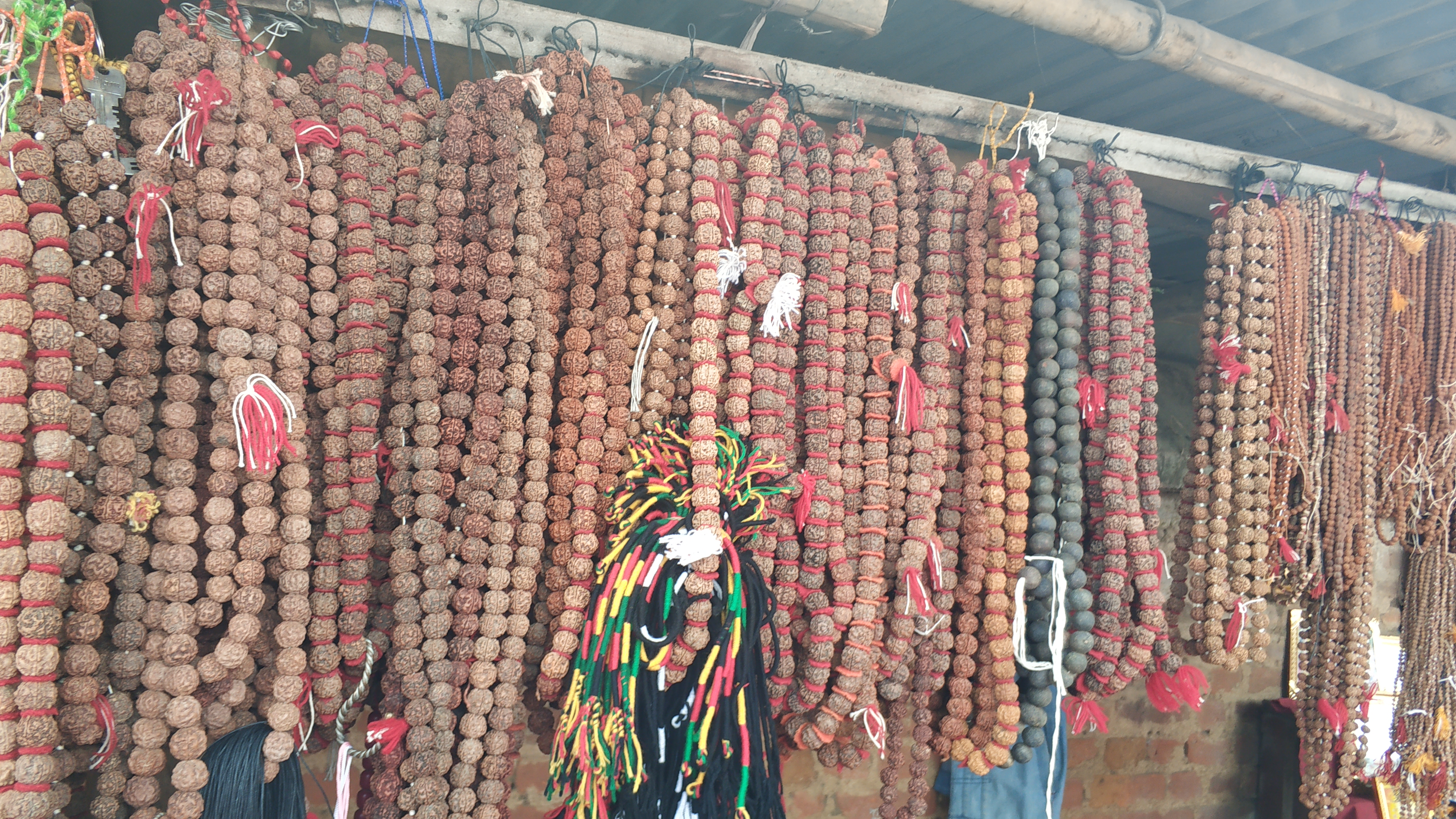
Various Indian rudraksha malas

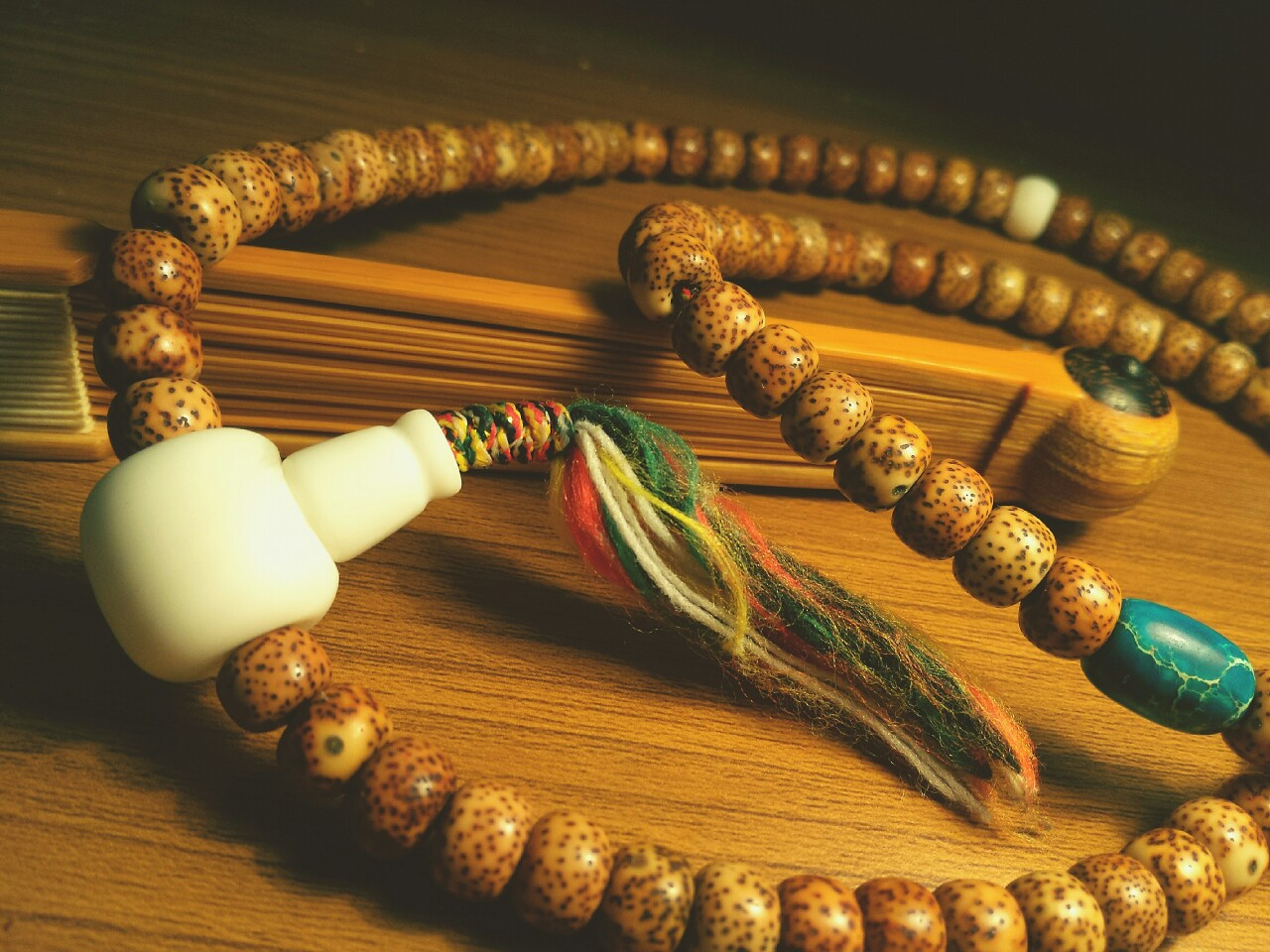
A polished Chinese seed mala

Common materials are wood from the sandalwood tree, along with the seeds of various trees, and precious or semiprecious stones.

Strings may be made from practically any fibre, traditionally silk or wool or cotton though synthetic monofilaments or cords such as nylon can now be found and are favoured for their low cost and good wear resistance. Elastic cords, such as milliner's elastic, may be used and have the advantage that they can stretch to fit over the wearer's hand if worn on the wrist whereas other material may not wrap a sufficient number of times to prevent the mala from slipping off. Beads may also be joined by metal chains.

=== Hinduism ===
Beads made from the fruitstones of the rudraksha tree (Elaeocarpus ganitrus) are considered sacred by Saivas, devotees of Siva, and its use is taught in the Rudrakshajabala Upanishad. Beads made from the wood of the tulsi plant are used and revered by Vaishnavas, followers of Vishnu.

=== Mahayana Buddhism ===
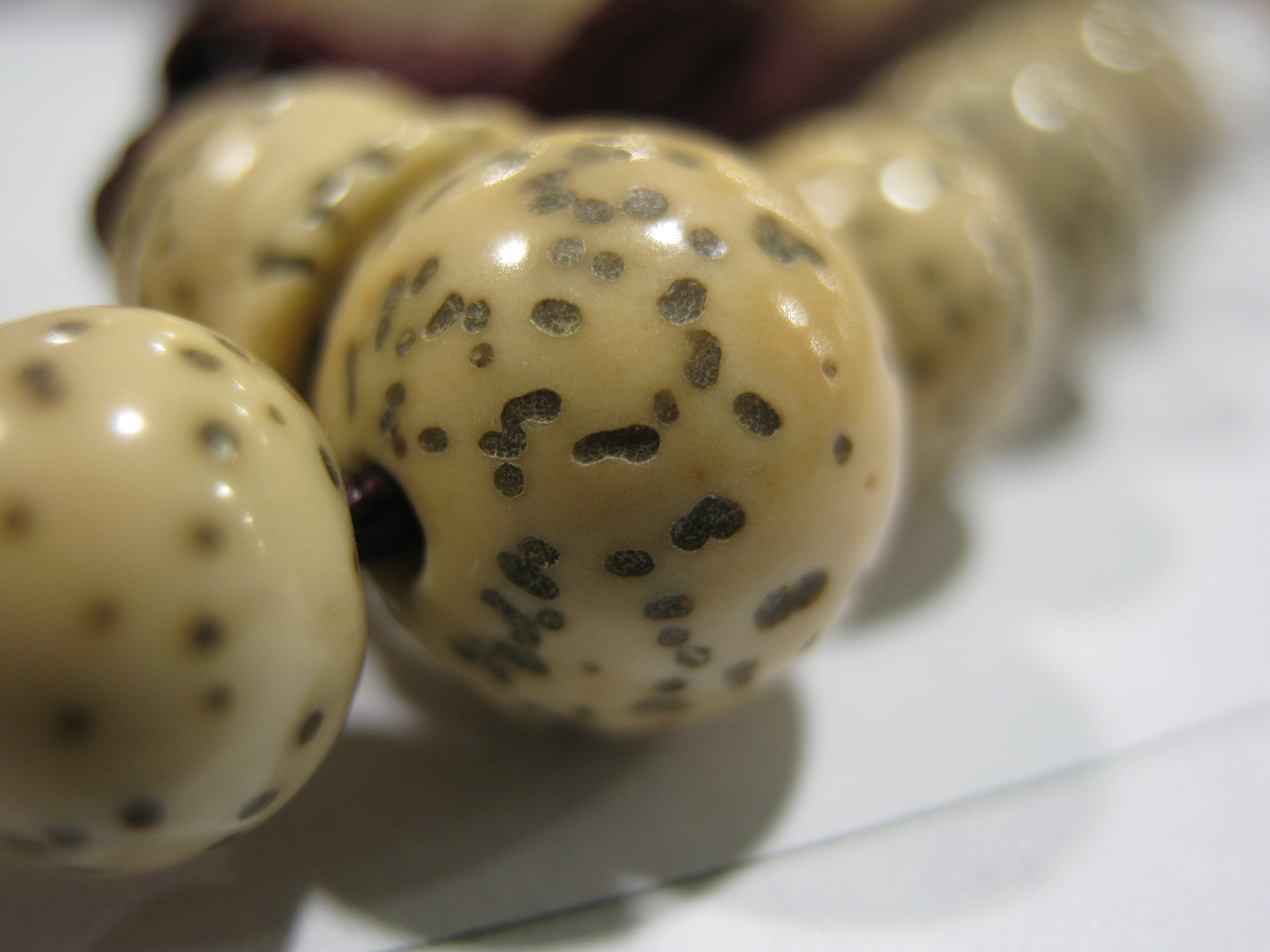
Polished Calamus jenkinsianus seeds on a "Moon and Stars" mala

A very popular type of mala among Mahayana Buddhists are those made of "bodhi seeds", which are actually made from various species belonging to Arecaceae and Fabaceae rather than of the seeds of the bodhi tree. The most common bead types in China and Tibet are:

- "Phoenix eye" beads, made from Ziziphus abyssinica or Ziziphus jujuba
- "Moon and Stars" beads, made from Calamus jenkinsianus
- "Bodhi root" beads, made from Corypha umbraculifera
- "King Kong" beads (i.e. Rudraksha), made from Elaeocarpus angustifolius

==== Tibetan Buddhism ====
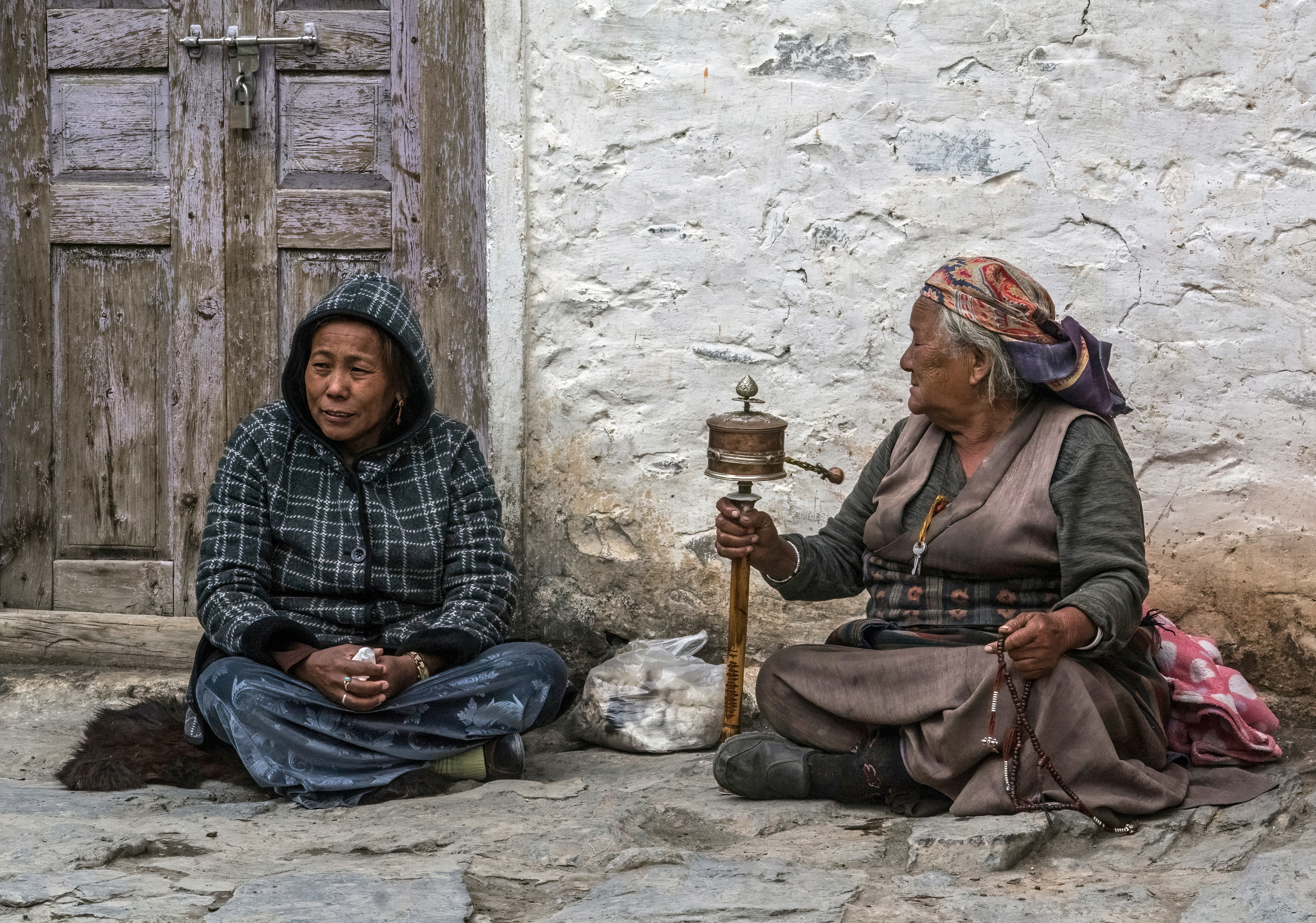
Women praying in Nepal

Various types of malas (Tibetan: trengwa) are used in Tibetan Buddhism, including "Bodhi seed" (commonly made from seeds of a Ziziphus tree), wood (such as sandalwood), bone and precious stones. Tibetan Buddhists generally consider malas made from precious stones as the best kind. Some popular stones are agate, sapphire or lapis lazuli. Semiprecious stones such as carnelian and amethyst may be used, as well.

Some common general-purpose malas in Tibetan Buddhism are made from rattan seeds (especially Calamus jenkinsianus). These beads are called "moon and stars" by Tibetans, and variously called "lotus root", "lotus seed" and "linden nut" by various retailers (though it does not come from any Nelumbo plants). The bead itself is very hard and dense, ivory-coloured (which gradually turns a deep golden brown with long use), and has small holes (moons) and tiny black dots (stars) covering its surface.

Tibetan Buddhists also teach that certain types of malas can enhance specific practices or bring specific benefits. For example:

- malas made of wood (sandalwood or bodhi tree wood), bodhi seeds, various jewels, or ivory are all purpose malas and are said to be good for all kinds of mantras and practices
- crystal, pearl, conch, nacre, wood, seeds, or other clear or white in colour beads may be used to count mantras used for peaceful deity yoga practices and for purification practices. For these types of practices, white colored beads and a white colored thread is preferred.
- beads made of precious metals like gold or silver may be used for increasing practices, such as increasing lifespan, knowledge, or merit; For these types of practices, yellow colors and colored thread are preferred.
- Red Coral is for magnetizing / power practices, and red color is used for the threads. The colour red is also associated with the Padma family of buddhas (who are highly revered in Tibet).
- Rudraksha, bone, iron, steel and turquoise is preferred for subjugating malicious spirits or for the tantric transformation of powerful afflictions like anger (this is sometimes called "wrathful practice"). For these types of practices, black is the preferred colour.

One type of wooden mala bead has a shallow trench engraved around their equator into which tiny pieces of red coral and turquoise are affixed. Due to the cost of already harvested or fossilized red coral and its conservation status, as well as the cost of turquoise, plastic or glass may be used instead.

=== Nepal ===
In Nepal, mala beads are made from the natural seeds of Ziziphus budhensis, a plant in the family Rhamnaceae endemic to the Temal region of Kavrepalanchok in Bagmati Province.

The Government of Nepal's Ministry of Forestry has established a committee and begun to distribute seedlings of these plant so as to uplift the economic status of the people living in this area.

=== Japanese Buddhism ===
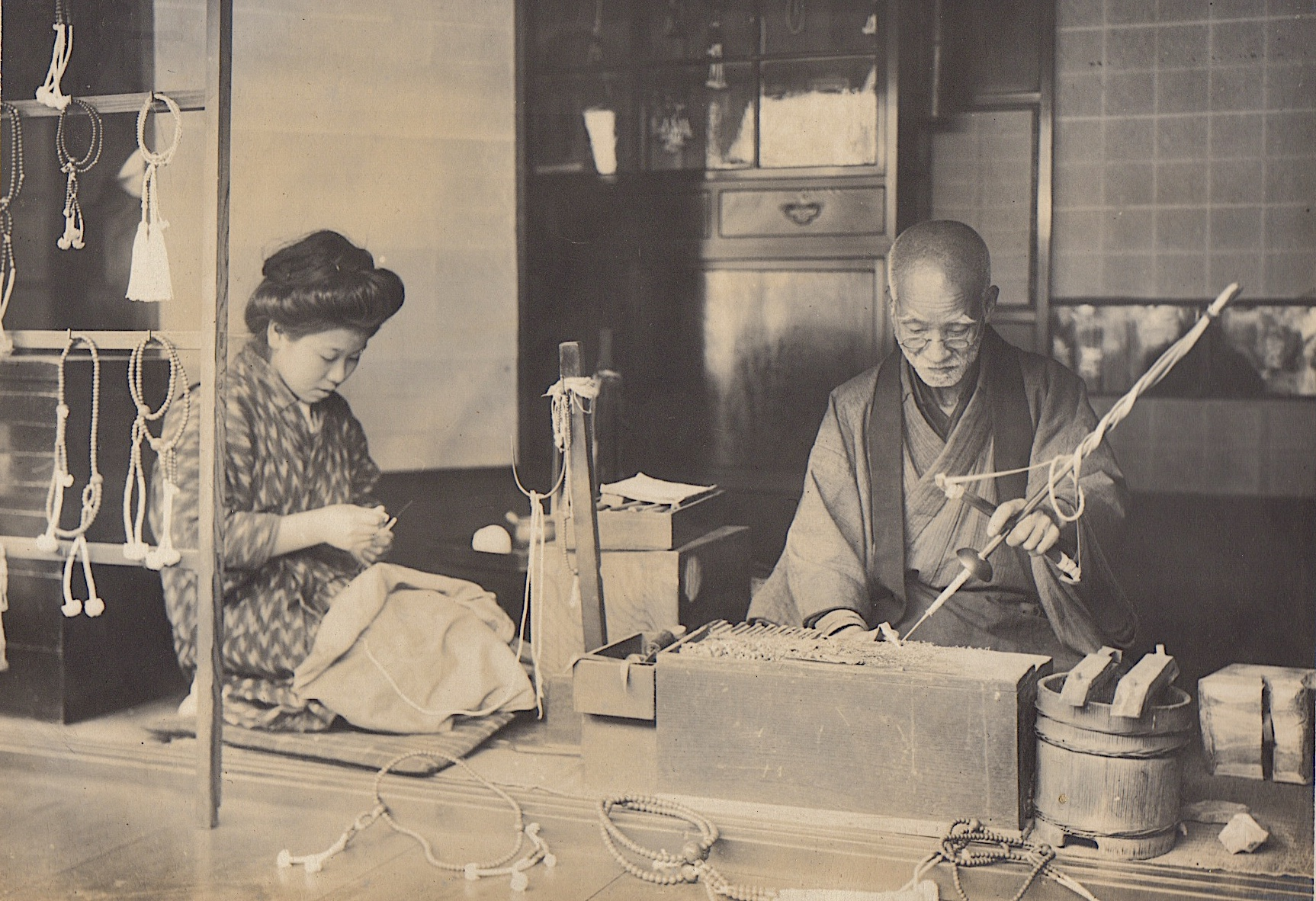
Making juzu in Japan, a photo taken by Elstner Hilton (1914)

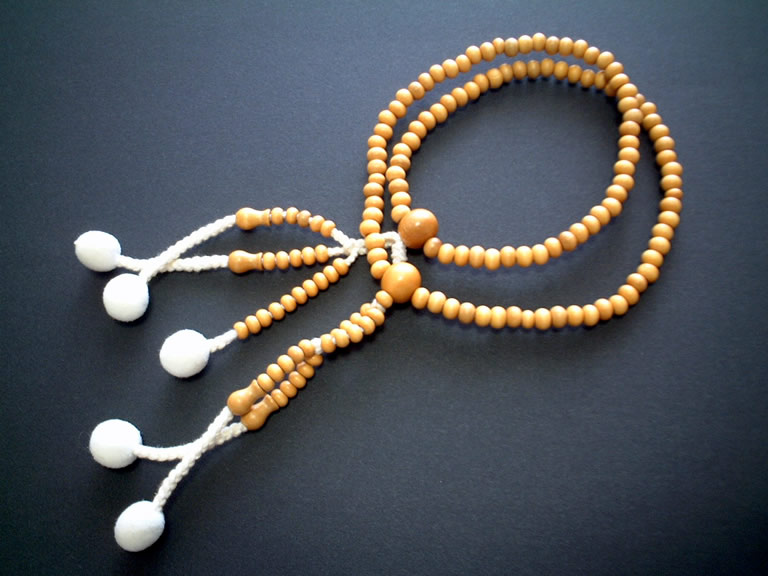
Nichiren style nenju

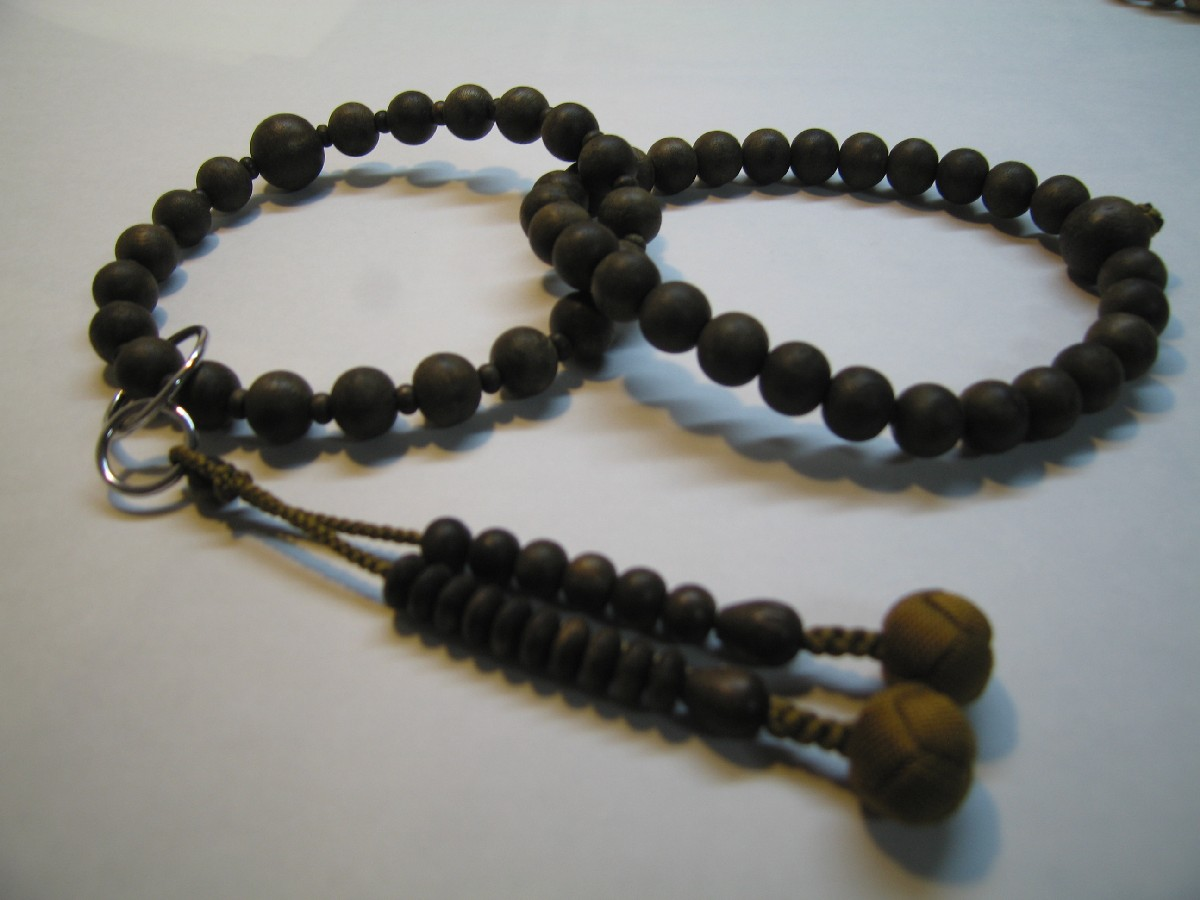
Jodo Shu style nenju

In Buddhism in Japan, Buddhist prayer beads are known as ojuzu (数珠; counting beads) or onenju (念珠; mindfulness beads), where the "o" is the honorific o-. Different Buddhist sects in Japan have different shaped prayer beads, and use them differently. Most Japanese Buddhist malas are made out of various types of wood, such as rosewood, plumwood, and lignum vitae.

For example, the Shingon and Tendai generally use longer prayer beads (108 beads) with counter strands on both ends for recording multiple rounds of recitation (Tendai malas have 2 recorder bead strands, Shingon malas have four). These recorder strands usually end in decorative tassels.

During devotional services, the beads may be rubbed together with both hands to create a soft grinding noise, which is considered to have a purifying and reverential effect. A notable feature of Tendai school's prayer beads is the use of flat beads called "soroban beads" for the main beads (while most of the other sects use spherical beads). For the Shingon school, they use a red string as the main string for the 108 beads and white tassels for the counter beads.

Nichiren schools generally use long 108 bead nenjus with five counter strands with ornamental tassels.

The Japanese Zen schools use long 108 bead nenjus without counter / recorder bead strands.

Meanwhile, in Jōdo Shinshū (True Pure Land), prayer beads are typically shorter and held draped over both hands and are not ground together, as this is forbidden.

Jōdo-shū is somewhat unusual because of the use of a double-ringed prayer beads, called nikka juzu (日課数珠), which are used for counting nenbutsu recitations (i.e. recitation of the name of Amitabha Buddha): one ring contains single beads used to count a single recitation while the other ring is used to count full revolutions of the first ring. Additionally, other beads hang from the strings, which can count full revolutions of the second ring (flat beads), or full revolutions of the first string of beads. In all, it is possible to count up to 120,000 recitations using these beads. The design is credited to a follower of Hōnen named Awanosuke.

=== Theravada Buddhism ===
Theravada Buddhists in Myanmar use prayer beads called seik badi (စိပ်ပုတီး [seɪʔ bədí]), shortened to badi. 108 beads are strung on a garland, with the beads typically made of fragrant wood like sandalwood, and series of brightly coloured strings at the end of the garland. It is commonly used in samatha meditation, to keep track of the number of mantras chanted during meditation.

Mantra recitation with malas is also common in the various forms of Southern Esoteric Buddhism, a class of esoteric traditions within Southeast Asian Theravada Buddhism.

== Number of beads ==
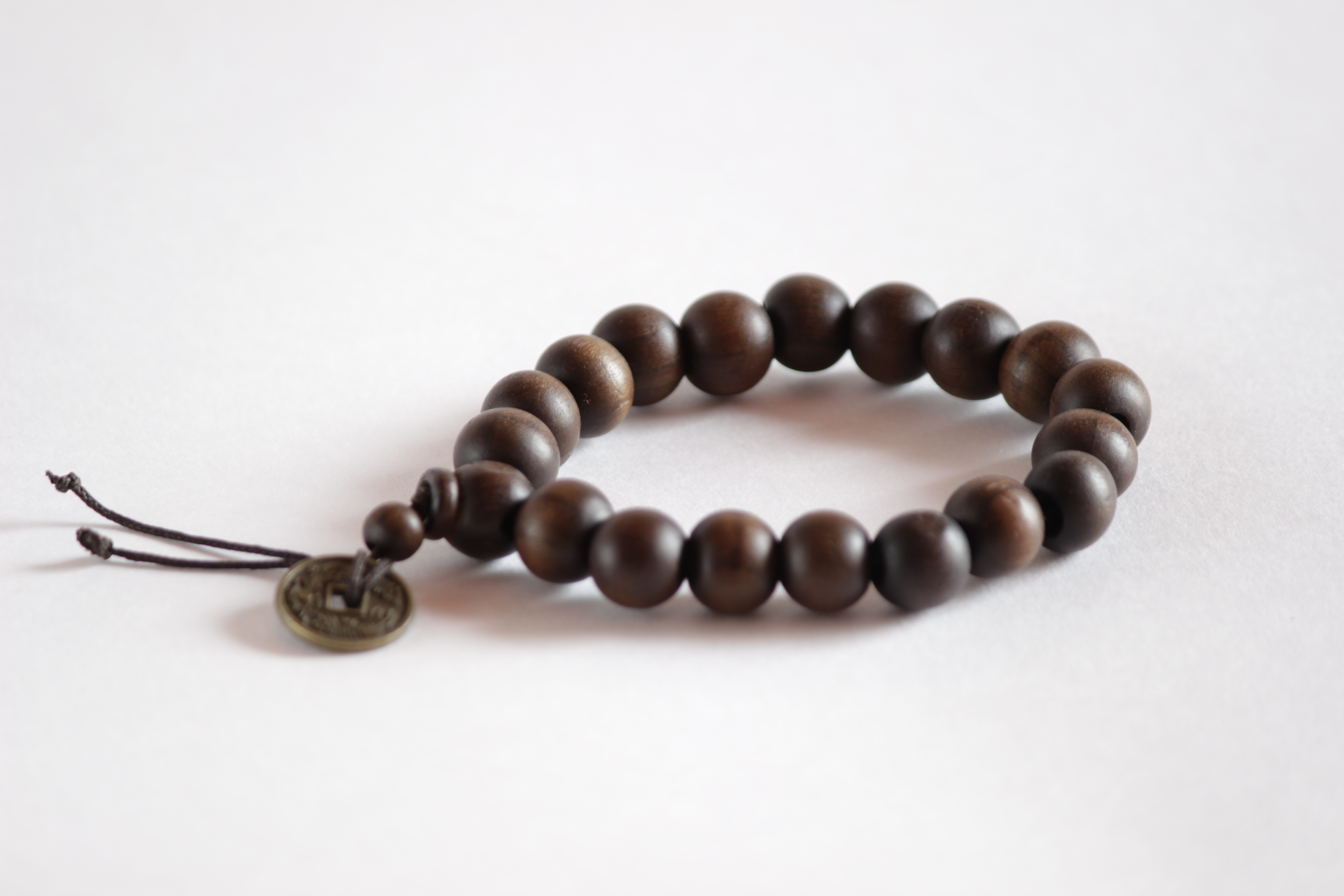
Chinese Buddhist 18-bead wooden mala

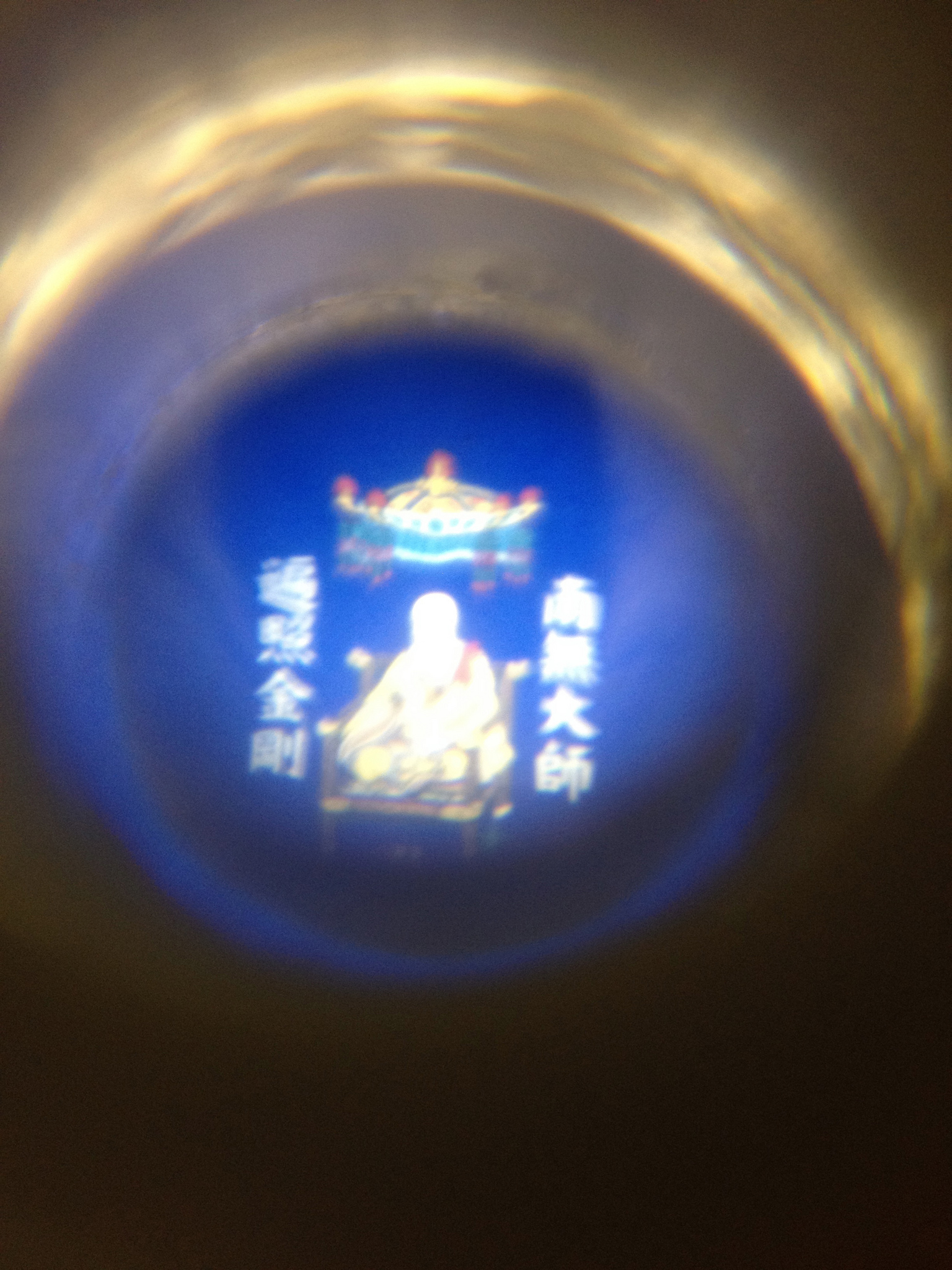
A large mother bead containing an image of Shingon founder Kūkai flanked by mantras

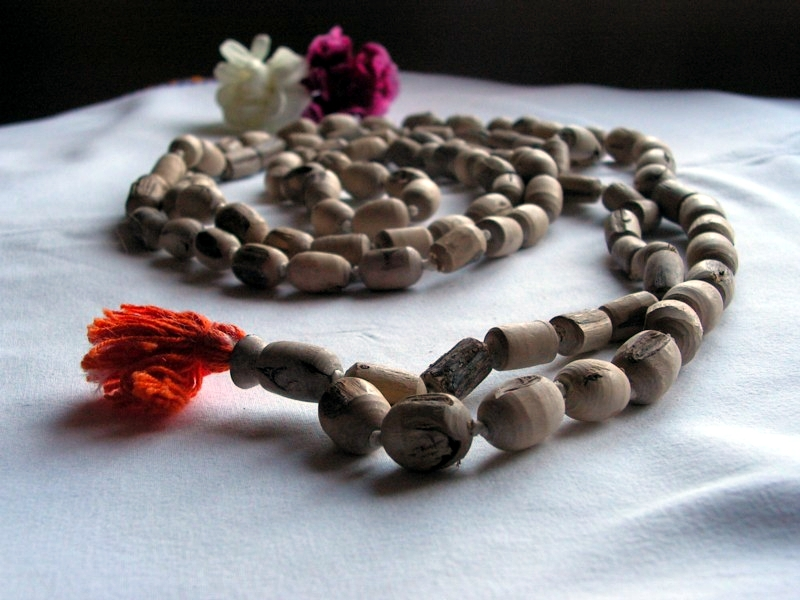
108 bead Tulasi wood mala used in Vaishnavism

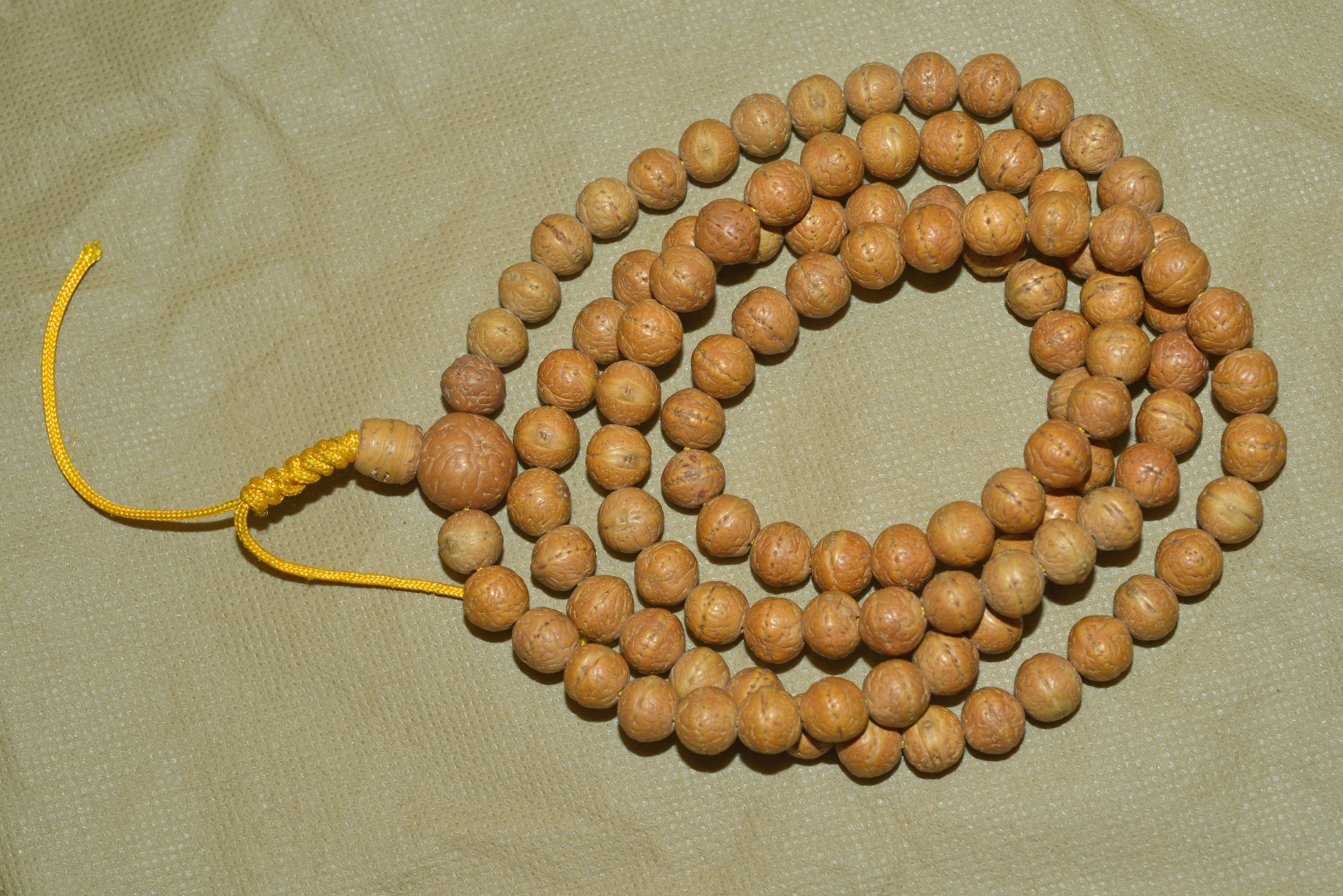
"Bodhi seed" mala made using the polished seeds of the Ziziphus budhensis tree, known locally as Buddhacita, which are endemic to the Timal region of Kavreplanchok and at Namobuddha in Central Nepal

There are numerous explanations why there are typically 108 beads, with the number 108 bearing special religious significance in a number of Hindu, Buddhist, and Jain traditions.

For example, in traditional Buddhist thought, people are said to have 108 afflictions or kleshas. In another reckoning, 108 is the number of possible dharmas or phenomena. In East Asian Buddhism, 108 can also represent 108 meditations, or the Buddhist 108 deities in the Diamond Realm Mandala. Despite the varying explanations for the use of this number, the number itself has been kept consistent over centuries of practice.

Smaller malas are also known, most commonly with a factor of 108 beads or another number significant to a sect's beliefs and practices, such as 54, 42, 27, 21, 18 and 14. A smaller mala may be worn on the wrist or used to more conveniently keep count of prostrations. The 54, whether in a 54 bead mala or the first 54 beads in a full 108 bead mala, is often interpreted as signifying the first 54 stages of the bodhisattva path (as understood in East Asian Buddhism). One source even mentions a mala with 1080 beads.

Many malas will have a 109th bead which is variously called the guru bead, mother bead (Japanese: boju), parent bead, Buddha bead, Sumeru bead, or bindu bead. It is often larger, more elaborate, or of a distinctive material or colour. Some malas also have a secondary larger or more ornate bead halfway through the mala, marking the halfway point. These are sometimes called middle beads (Japanese: nakadama).

In some Buddhist traditions, the guru bead represents The Buddha, Buddha Amitabha or Avalokitesvara. The Sūtra on the Rosary of the Vajraśekhara Yoga states that the mother bead is Amitabha, the string is Avalokiteshvara and the other beads are the fruits of the bodhisattva path. Tibetan Buddhist malas may have three extra beads as the guru beads, instead of just one. These symbolize the three vajras (the Buddha's body, speech and mind).

It is common to find prayer beads in Japan that contain a small image inside the guru bead, usually something associated with the particular temple or sect. When held up to the light the image is clearly visible.

=== Additional beads ===
Mala may have extra beads hanging from the guru/mother bead or middle bead. These may be decorative elements, especially when unable to move along the cord because knots hold them in place. They may or may not have religious symbolism (for example, three beads representing the Buddhist Triple Gem of Buddha, Dharma and Sangha) but are not used for counting recitations in any way.

=== Counting markers and cords ===
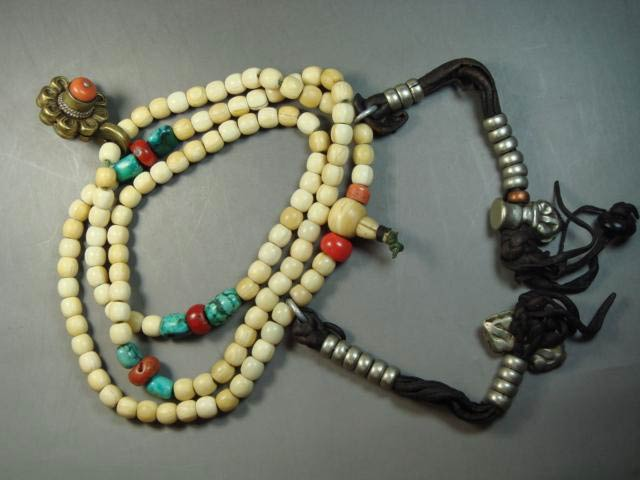
Tibetan style mala with two counter attachments

Vajrayana Buddhism can require that a practitioner complete a particular number of repetitions of an activity as a foundational practice or to become eligible for initiation into an esoteric teaching, for example, one may need to complete 100,000 recitations of Vajrasattva mantra.

To aid this, some Buddhist malas can be made with additional functional beads over and above the 108 main beads. These beads take two main forms serving two different purposes: three marker beads inline with the 108 beads; two short cords of ten beads each hanging from the main loop which are used as counters.

Japanese malas may also contain tassels (房, fusa) with counter beads, also known as recorder beads (記子珠, kishi- or kisu-dama). They are seen as symbolizing the ten pāramitās.

==== Inline marker beads ====
In some more complex malas, three distinctive, often smaller, beads are placed so that, with the guru bead, they divide the regular beads into four sections of 27 beads each. They allow quick estimation of the fraction of a round completed. Their presence raises the number of beads (not counting the guru bead) to 111.

Japanese malas may also contain a set of four inline marker beads which often differ in size, color, or material. These are called four points beads (shiten 四天) or “Four Heavenly Kings” (四天王, shitennō). These are usually located after the seventh and the twenty-first beads on either side of the mother bead. In the Shingon school, these four symbolize four bodhisattvas: Fugen (Skt. Samantabhadra), Kannon, Monju (Skt. Mañjuśrī), and Miroku (Skt. Maitreya).

==== Beads on separate cords ====
The short cords may either be permanently attached to the mala or they may be obtained separately; they do not need to match the main beads. These short cords may either be attached individually to the main loop or they may be joined at their common top. The cords end in small charms, usually a different charm on each, with a dorje and a bell shape being common. Their cord is thicker than normal so that the beads on them will not slide under their own weight but can be moved by the chanter.

After a single round of chanting, the user will slide up one bead on the cord with the dorje which represents 108 (or 111) recitations. After ten rounds all ten dorje beads have been moved up, one bead on the bell cord is raised representing 1080 (or 1110) recitations and the dorje beads are all reset to their low position.

To keep track of more recitations, the chanter may use a small metal charm called a bhum counter. (Bhum, approximately pronounced "boom", is Tibetan for "one hundred thousand".) The bhum counter starts next to the guru bead and is attached to the main string by a clip or a slip knot. When the tenth bell bead has been raised (10 800 or 11 100 recitations), the chanter moves the bhum counter to the next space between beads (and resets the beads on the bell cord). By consistently moving the bhum counter in the same direction about 1.2 million recitations can be counted.

== Religious usage ==
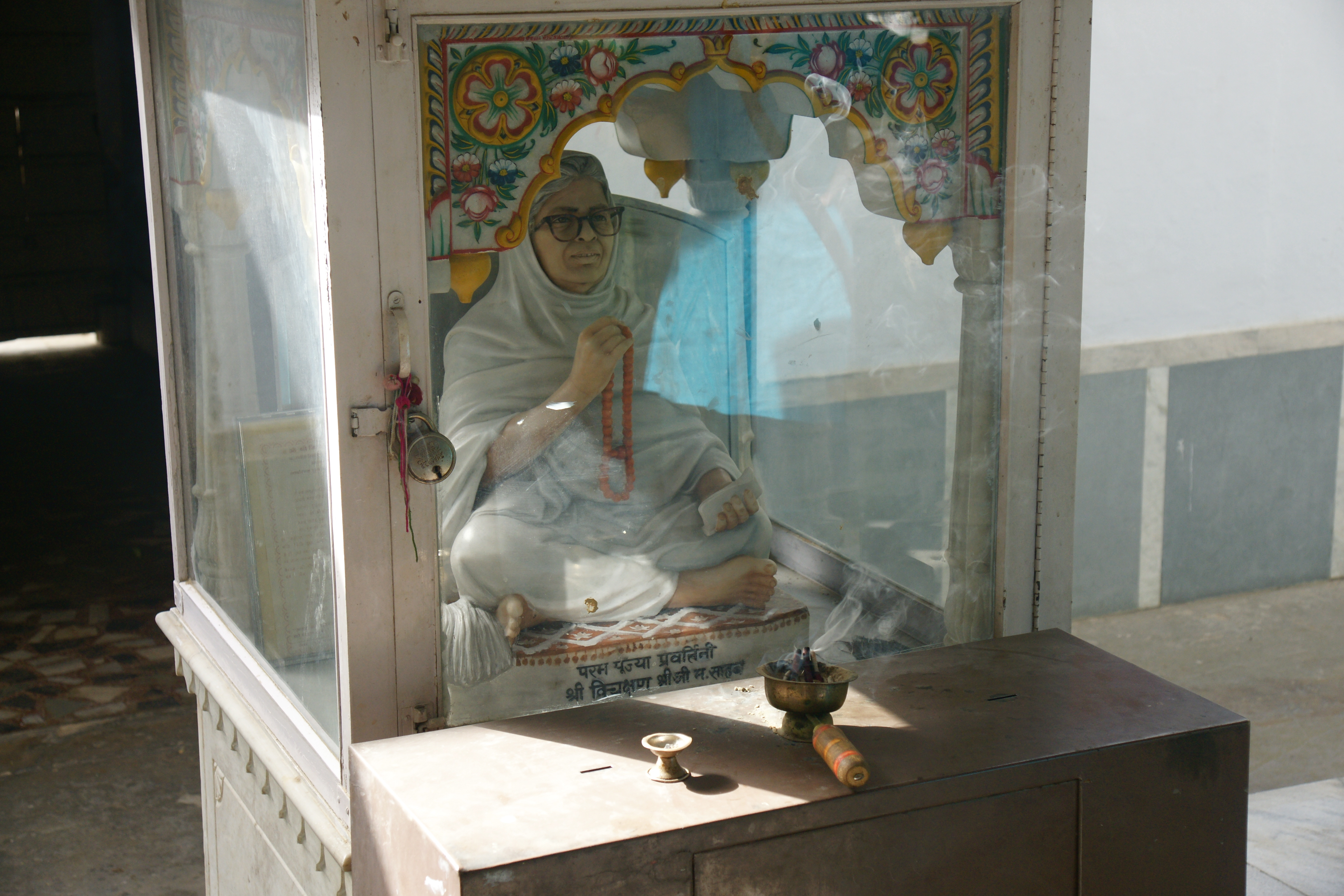
Sculpture of a Jain sadhvi holding a japamala

The main use of a mala is to repeat mantras or other important religious phrases and prayers (like the Pure Land Buddhist nianfo). Mantras are typically repeated hundreds or even thousands of times. The mala is used so that those who are trying to achieve an exact number of repetitions can focus on the meaning or sound of the mantra rather than counting its repetitions.

In addition to their practical use as an aide in recitation, malas have traditionally been ascribed to have additional spiritual qualities to experience devotion, peace, stability, positivity, harmony and soul’s reverence. Different materials may be ascribed the power to help with different practical or spiritual problems, and the mala itself may be ascribed talismanic, magical, and apotropaic characteristics. Buddhist sources such as the Sutra of Mañjuśrï’s Fundamental Ritual state that wearing a mala can purify bad karma and ward off evil spirits. In East Asian Buddhism, some malas are made specifically to be worn for warding off evil and for attracting good fortune.

In some traditions, malas are consecrated before use in a manner similar to images of deities, through the use of mantras, dharani, or the application of some substance or pigment like saffron water.

In Tibetan Buddhism, malas are often blessed by lamas. They are also often consecrated with a fragrant substance like sandalwood oil. Some lamas teach that before using a new mala, the practitioner should wash the mala (and his hands as well) and then scent it with oil. A practitioner can then consecrate the mala by holding it and practicing a tantric visualization and reciting a mantra. This is believed to empower the mala and multiply one's mantra recitations.

Malas purchased from temples and monasteries may have been blessed by the residents of that institution. Mala may also be blessed after purchase. Popular folk tales may describe malas as becoming imbued with the power of the many recitations it has been used for, or a mala given by a respected monk may be said to have the power to cure illnesses or to restore fertility to barren individuals.

Furthermore, wearing a distinctive mala can also serve as a symbol of religious identification, marking its wearer as a member of a specific religious community and as "physical evidence of faith, devotion, and practice."

A mala used by a particular holy figure may then serve as a relic after their death.

=== Carrying and storing ===
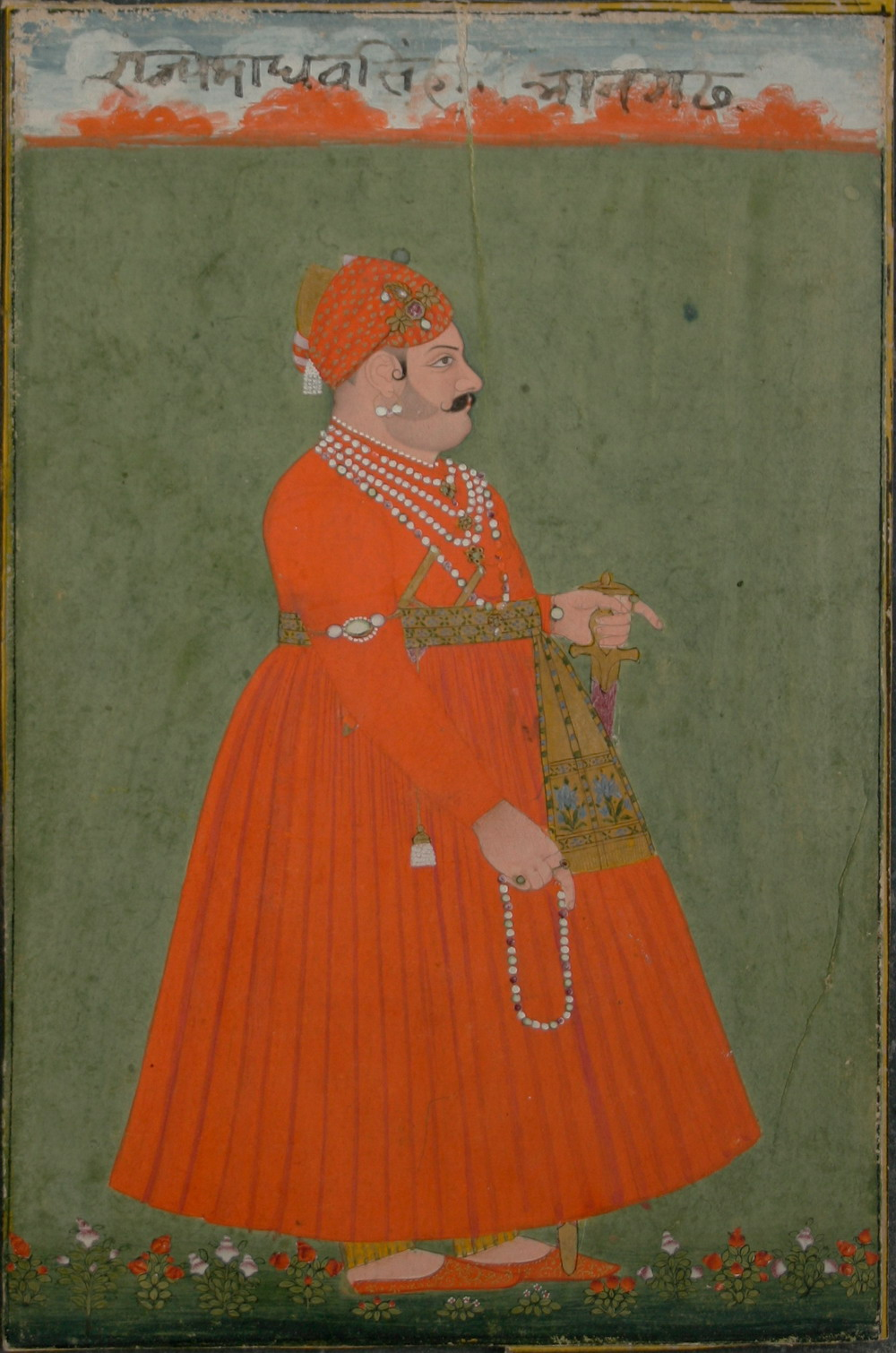
Portrait of Sawai Madho Singh counting beads on a pearl and ruby mala; Jaipur, c. 1750

A mala may be worn by practitioners in several ways:

- Wrapped several times to fit on the wrist
- As a necklace, especially if made from large, consequently heavy, beads
- Suspended from a belt

However they are worn the wearer is supposed to keep the mala from making contact with the floor or ground.

In Chinese Buddhism, mala bracelets are worn by monks and laypeople as a symbol of the Buddha. Malas are often given to laypersons during refuge ceremonies and they are instructed to wear them at all times, as a representation of the Buddha which is present in one's life at all times (except when bathing or using the toilet).

Some Tibetan Buddhist teachers teach that it is a root samaya (tantric commitment) that a consecrated and blessed mala should always be kept on one's person. For Tibetan Buddhists, the mala is a symbol of their yidam meditation deity and a reminder of their main mantra and tantric commitments (samayas).

Mala may be carried in small pouches from which they are removed before use. Some practitioners, such as the Vaishanava members of ISKCON, may carry their malas in larger pouches which hang from the back of the hand and allow the mala to be manipulated while it is being used without it being significantly exposed to public view or risking contact with the ground.

In the home, mala may be stored in a pouch or not. Some practitioners may store their malas in jewelry boxes or similar containers.

Practitioners who have an altar or shrine in their homes may additionally choose to keep their malas on the altar when not being used or carried.

=== Method of use ===
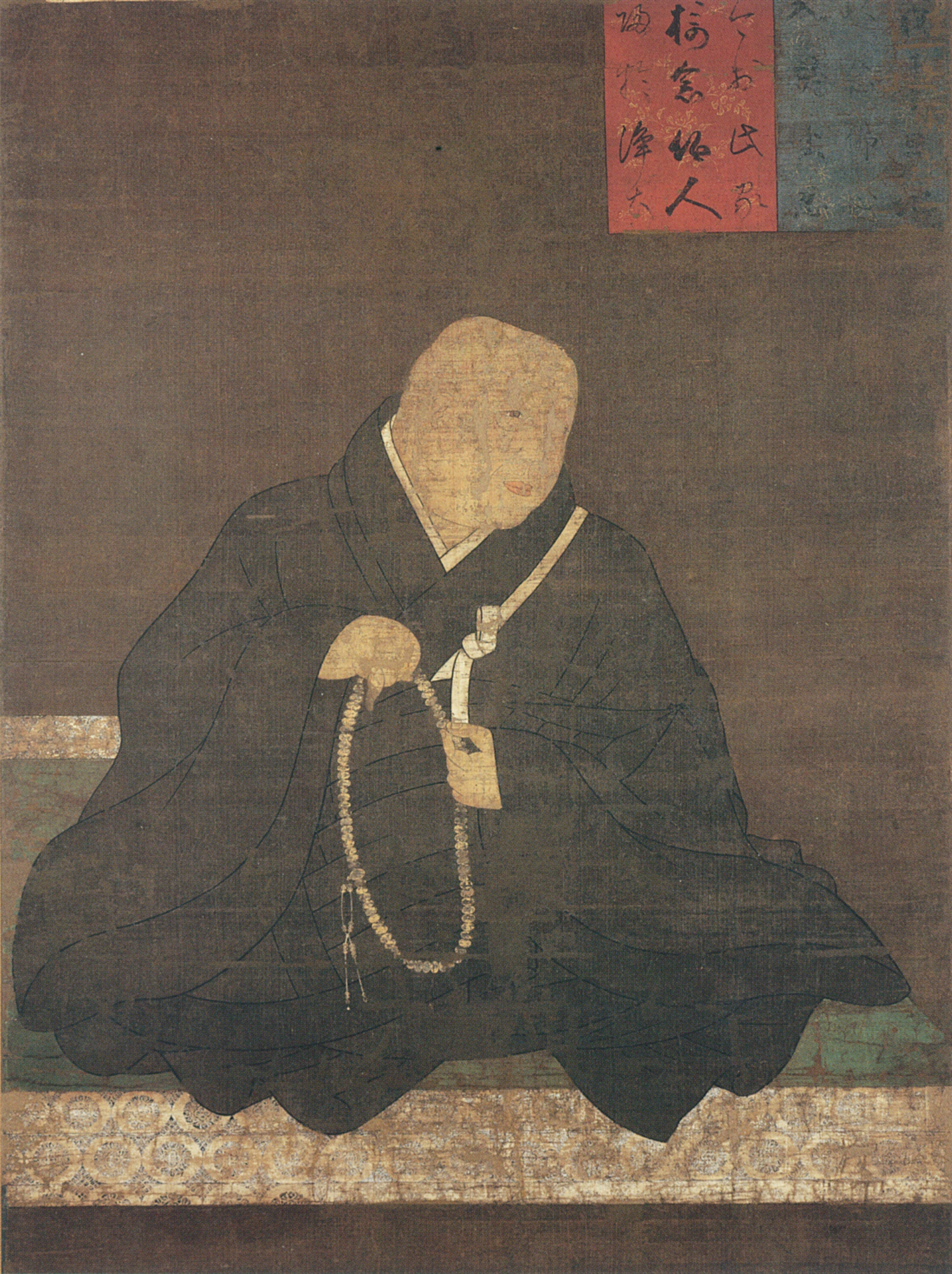
Illustration of the Japanese Pure Land teacher Honen holding a mala with both hands

In Hinduism, the loop is draped over the index finger of the right hand and held in place by the right thumb of the first bead next to the guru bead. As each recitation is completed the loop is advanced by one bead. Some practitioners will hold their other three fingers next to their index finger so that all four fingers are inside the loop. Other practitioners will have only their index finger inside the loop, separating this finger from the other three (for similar reasons as in the next paragraph).

Some practitioners will drape the loop over their second finger (with their third and fourth fingers also inside) and use their index finger to move the beads towards the thumb. This is said to be symbolic of the atma (represented by the index finger) moving towards Paramatma (represented by the thumb) by the vehicle of the mantra (the beads) overcoming elements of the material world (the three other fingers).

In Buddhism, there are numerous ways of holding a mala and using it during recitation. This differs across traditions. It is commonly taught that the left hand is used to hold a mala. However, sometimes both hands are involved in the recitation and counting process. In Chinese Buddhism it is common for monks to wear it around their necks when not in use. In other traditions, the mala is left on one's altar or placed in a pouch when not in use. In Tibetan Buddhism, malas used for esoteric (mantrayana) practices are often kept private and should not be shown to anyone.

Tibetan Buddhists generally teach the use of the left hand for counting mantras. Different methods of holding it and moving the beads are taught in Tibetan Buddhism, depending on the type of practice. For example, for peaceful deity practices, one moves the beads towards the body over the forefinger and one holds the mala at the heart. For increasing practices meanwhile, one moves the beads over the middle finger and holds the mala at the navel.

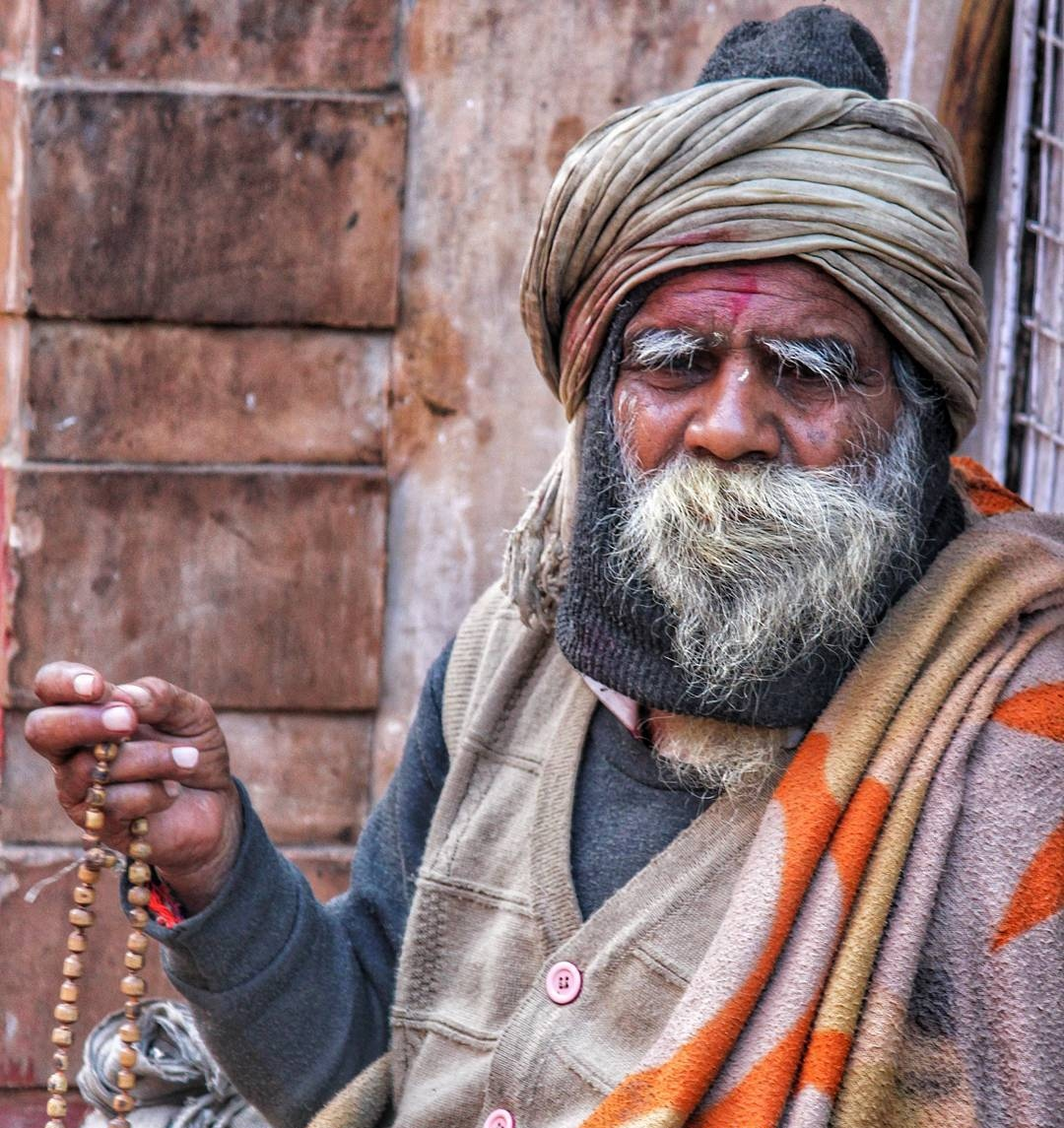
Hindu holy man - sadhu at Vrindavan

A common taboo is that the guru bead is not used for counting repetitions; counting for each round begins and ends with either of the beads next to the guru bead. In the Hindu tradition and some Buddhist traditions, practitioners who undertake more than one round at a time will, rather than moving their fingers across the guru bead, turn the mala around so that the same bead which was used at the end of the previous round becomes the first bead use for the next round.

=== Aesthetic usage ===
In recent years, it has become common for non-religious individuals to wear such beads as a fashion accessory with the beads having no religious connotation whatsoever.

Similar practices have been noted since the Ming dynasty, when malas began to be used as fashionable accessories by members of the Chinese court. Sumptuary laws regulated the materials of malas in Qing dynasty-era China.

Opinion is divided as to whether a mala that is worn as decoration can also be used for the practise of japa or if two separate malas are required.

== See also ==
- Beadwork
- Pace count beads
- Phuang malai
- Prayer rope
- Rosary
- Worry beads
